= List of integration and measure theory topics =

This is a list of integration and measure theory topics, by Wikipedia page.

== Intuitive foundations ==
- Length
- Area
- Volume
- Probability
- Moving average

== Riemann integral ==
- Riemann sum
- Riemann–Stieltjes integral
- Bounded variation
- Jordan content

== Improper integrals ==
- Cauchy principal value

== Measure theory and the Lebesgue integral ==
- Measure (mathematics)
  - Sigma algebra
    - Separable sigma algebra
  - Filtration (abstract algebra)
- Borel algebra
- Borel measure
- Indicator function
- Lebesgue measure
- Lebesgue integration
- Lebesgue's density theorem
- Counting measure
- Complete measure
- Haar measure
- Outer measure
- Borel regular measure
- Radon measure
- Measurable function
- Null set, negligible set
- Almost everywhere, conull set
- Lp space
- Borel–Cantelli lemma
- Lebesgue's monotone convergence theorem
- Fatou's lemma
- Absolutely continuous
- Uniform absolute continuity
- Total variation
- Radon–Nikodym theorem
- Fubini's theorem
  - Double integral
- Vitali set, non-measurable set

== Extensions ==
- Henstock–Kurzweil integral
- Amenable group
- Banach–Tarski paradox
- Hausdorff paradox

== Integral equations ==
- Fredholm equation
  - Fredholm operator
- Liouville–Neumann series

== Integral transforms ==
See also list of transforms, list of Fourier-related transforms

- Kernel (integral operator)
- Convolution
- Radon transform

== Integral geometry ==
- Buffon's needle
- Hadwiger's theorem
- mean width
- intrinsic volumes

== Other ==
- Stokes theorem
- Differentiation under the integral sign
- Contour integration
  - Examples of contour integration

== See also ==
- List of calculus topics
- List of multivariable calculus topics
- List of real analysis topics
- List of integrals
- List of integrals of exponential functions
- List of integrals of hyperbolic functions
- List of integrals of irrational functions
- List of integrals of logarithmic functions
- List of integrals of rational functions
- List of integrals of trigonometric functions
- List of integrals of inverse trigonometric functions
