= List of calculus topics =

This is a list of calculus topics.

== Limits ==
- Limit (mathematics)
- Limit of a function
  - One-sided limit
- Limit of a sequence
- Indeterminate form
- Orders of approximation
- (ε, δ)-definition of limit
- Continuous function

== Differential calculus ==
- Derivative
- Notation
  - Newton's notation for differentiation
  - Leibniz's notation for differentiation
- Simplest rules
  - Derivative of a constant
  - Sum rule in differentiation
  - Constant factor rule in differentiation
  - Linearity of differentiation
  - Power rule
- Chain rule
- Local linearization
- Product rule
- Quotient rule
- Inverse functions and differentiation
- Implicit differentiation
- Stationary point
  - Maxima and minima
  - First derivative test
  - Second derivative test
  - Extreme value theorem
- Differential equation
- Differential operator
- Newton's method
- Taylor's theorem
- L'Hôpital's rule
- General Leibniz rule
- Mean value theorem
- Logarithmic derivative
- Differential (calculus)
- Related rates
- Regiomontanus' angle maximization problem
- Rolle's theorem

== Integral calculus ==
- Antiderivative/Indefinite integral
- Simplest rules
  - Sum rule in integration
  - Constant factor rule in integration
  - Linearity of integration
- Arbitrary constant of integration
- Cavalieri's quadrature formula
- Fundamental theorem of calculus
- Integration by parts
- Inverse chain rule method
- Integration by substitution
  - Tangent half-angle substitution
- Differentiation under the integral sign
- Trigonometric substitution
- Partial fractions in integration
  - Quadratic integral
- Proof that 22/7 exceeds π
- Trapezium rule
- Integral of the secant function
- Integral of secant cubed
- Arclength
- Solid of revolution
- Shell integration

== Special functions and numbers ==
- Natural logarithm
- e (mathematical constant)
- Exponential function
- Hyperbolic angle
- Hyperbolic function
- Stirling's approximation
- Bernoulli numbers

== Numerical formulas ==
See also List of numerical analysis topics

- Rectangle method
- Trapezoidal rule
- Simpson's rule
- Newton–Cotes formulas
- Gaussian quadrature

== Lists and tables ==
- Table of common limits
- Table of derivatives
- Table of integrals
- Table of mathematical symbols
- List of integrals
- List of integrals of rational functions
- List of integrals of irrational functions
- List of integrals of trigonometric functions
- List of integrals of inverse trigonometric functions
- List of integrals of hyperbolic functions
- List of integrals of exponential functions
- List of integrals of logarithmic functions
- List of integrals of area functions

== Multivariable ==
- Partial derivative
- Disk integration
- Gabriel's horn
- Jacobian matrix
- Hessian matrix
- Curvature
- Green's theorem
- Divergence theorem
- Stokes' theorem
- Vector Calculus

== Series ==
- Infinite series
- Maclaurin series, Taylor series
- Fourier series
- Euler–Maclaurin formula

== History ==
- Adequality
- Infinitesimal
  - Archimedes' use of infinitesimals
- Gottfried Leibniz
- Isaac Newton
- Method of Fluxions
- Infinitesimal calculus
- Brook Taylor
- Colin Maclaurin
- Leonhard Euler
- Gauss
- Joseph Fourier
- Law of continuity
- History of calculus
- Generality of algebra

== Nonstandard calculus ==
- Elementary Calculus: An Infinitesimal Approach
- Nonstandard calculus
- Infinitesimal
- Archimedes' use of infinitesimals

For further developments: see list of real analysis topics, list of complex analysis topics, list of multivariable calculus topics.
