= List of integrals of inverse hyperbolic functions =

The following is a list of indefinite integrals (antiderivatives) of expressions involving the inverse hyperbolic functions. For a complete list of integral formulas, see lists of integrals.

- In all formulas the constant a is assumed to be nonzero, and C denotes the constant of integration.
- For each inverse hyperbolic integration formula below there is a corresponding formula in the list of integrals of inverse trigonometric functions.
- The ISO 80000-2 standard uses the prefix "ar-" rather than "arc-" for the inverse hyperbolic functions; we do that here.

== Inverse hyperbolic sine integration formulas ==
$$\int\operatorname{arsinh}(ax)\,dx=
x\operatorname{arsinh}(ax)-\frac{\sqrt{a^2x^2+1}}{a}+C$$

$$\int x\operatorname{arsinh}(ax)\,dx=
\frac{x^2\operatorname{arsinh}(ax)}{2}+
\frac{\operatorname{arsinh}(ax)}{4a^2}-
\frac{x \sqrt{a^2x^2+1}}{4a}+C$$

$$\int x^2\operatorname{arsinh}(ax)\,dx=
\frac{x^3\operatorname{arsinh}(ax)}{3}-
\frac{\left(a^2x^2-2\right)\sqrt{a^2x^2+1}}{9a^3}+C$$

$$\int x^m\operatorname{arsinh}(ax)\,dx=
\frac{x^{m+1}\operatorname{arsinh}(ax)}{m+1}-
\frac{a}{m+1}\int\frac{x^{m+1}}{\sqrt{a^2x^2+1}}\,dx\quad(m\ne-1)$$

$$\int\operatorname{arsinh}(ax)^2\,dx=
2x+x\operatorname{arsinh}(ax)^2-
\frac{2\sqrt{a^2x^2+1}\operatorname{arsinh}(ax)}{a}+C$$

$$\int\operatorname{arsinh}(ax)^n\,dx=
x\operatorname{arsinh}(ax)^n-
\frac{n\sqrt{a^2x^2+1}\operatorname{arsinh}(ax)^{n-1}}{a}+
n(n-1)\int\operatorname{arsinh}(ax)^{n-2}\,dx$$

$$\int\operatorname{arsinh}(ax)^n\,dx=
-\frac{x\operatorname{arsinh}(ax)^{n+2}}{(n+1)(n+2)}+
\frac{\sqrt{a^2x^2+1}\operatorname{arsinh}(ax)^{n+1}}{a(n+1)}+
\frac{1}{(n+1)(n+2)}\int\operatorname{arsinh}(ax)^{n+2}\,dx\quad(n\ne-1,-2)$$

== Inverse hyperbolic cosine integration formulas ==
$$\int\operatorname{arcosh}(ax)\,dx=
x\operatorname{arcosh}(ax)-
\frac{\sqrt{ax+1}\sqrt{ax-1}}{a}+C$$

$$\int x\operatorname{arcosh}(ax)\,dx=
\frac{x^2\operatorname{arcosh}(ax)}{2}-
\frac{\operatorname{arcosh}(ax)}{4a^2}-
\frac{x\sqrt{ax+1}\sqrt{ax-1}}{4a}+C$$

$$\int x^2\operatorname{arcosh}(ax)\,dx=
\frac{x^3\operatorname{arcosh}(ax)}{3}-\frac{\left(a^2x^2+2\right)\sqrt{ax+1}\sqrt{ax-1}}{9a^3}+C$$

$$\int x^m\operatorname{arcosh}(ax)\,dx=
\frac{x^{m+1}\operatorname{arcosh}(ax)}{m+1}-
\frac{a}{m+1}\int\frac{x^{m+1}}{\sqrt{ax+1}\sqrt{ax-1}}\,dx\quad(m\ne-1)$$

$$\int\operatorname{arcosh}(ax)^2\,dx=
2x+x\operatorname{arcosh}(ax)^2-
\frac{2\sqrt{ax+1}\sqrt{ax-1}\operatorname{arcosh}(ax)}{a}+C$$

$$\int\operatorname{arcosh}(ax)^n\,dx=
x\operatorname{arcosh}(ax)^n-
\frac{n\sqrt{ax+1}\sqrt{ax-1}\operatorname{arcosh}(ax)^{n-1}}{a}+
n(n-1)\int\operatorname{arcosh}(ax)^{n-2}\,dx$$

$$\int\operatorname{arcosh}(ax)^n\,dx=
-\frac{x\operatorname{arcosh}(ax)^{n+2}}{(n+1)(n+2)}+
\frac{\sqrt{ax+1}\sqrt{ax-1}\operatorname{arcosh}(ax)^{n+1}}{a(n+1)}+
\frac{1}{(n+1)(n+2)}\int\operatorname{arcosh}(ax)^{n+2}\,dx\quad(n\ne-1,-2)$$

== Inverse hyperbolic tangent integration formulas ==
$$\int\operatorname{artanh}(ax)\,dx=
x\operatorname{artanh}(ax)+
\frac{\ln\left(1-a^2x^2\right)}{2a}+C$$

$$\int x\operatorname{artanh}(ax)\,dx=
\frac{x^2\operatorname{artanh}(ax)}{2}-
\frac{\operatorname{artanh}(ax)}{2a^2}+\frac{x}{2a}+C$$

$$\int x^2\operatorname{artanh}(ax)\,dx=
\frac{x^3\operatorname{artanh}(ax)}{3}+
\frac{\ln\left(1-a^2x^2\right)}{6a^3}+\frac{x^2}{6a}+C$$

$$\int x^m\operatorname{artanh}(ax)\,dx=
\frac{x^{m+1}\operatorname{artanh}(ax)}{m+1}-
\frac{a}{m+1}\int\frac{x^{m+1}}{1-a^2x^2}\,dx\quad(m\ne-1)$$

== Inverse hyperbolic cotangent integration formulas ==
$$\int\operatorname{arcoth}(ax)\,dx=
x\operatorname{arcoth}(ax)+
\frac{\ln\left(a^2x^2-1\right)}{2a}+C$$

$$\int x\operatorname{arcoth}(ax)\,dx=
\frac{x^2\operatorname{arcoth}(ax)}{2}-
\frac{\operatorname{arcoth}(ax)}{2a^2}+\frac{x}{2a}+C$$

$$\int x^2\operatorname{arcoth}(ax)\,dx=
\frac{x^3\operatorname{arcoth}(ax)}{3}+
\frac{\ln\left(a^2x^2-1\right)}{6a^3}+\frac{x^2}{6a}+C$$

$$\int x^m\operatorname{arcoth}(ax)\,dx=
\frac{x^{m+1}\operatorname{arcoth}(ax)}{m+1}+
\frac{a}{m+1}\int\frac{x^{m+1}}{a^2x^2-1}\,dx\quad(m\ne-1)$$

== Inverse hyperbolic secant integration formulas ==
$$\int\operatorname{arsech}(ax)\,dx=
x\operatorname{arsech}(ax)-
\frac{2}{a}\operatorname{arctan}\sqrt{\frac{1-ax}{1+ax}}+C$$

$$\int x\operatorname{arsech}(ax)\,dx=
\frac{x^2\operatorname{arsech}(ax)}{2}-
\frac{(1+ax)}{2a^2}\sqrt{\frac{1-ax}{1+ax}}+C$$

$$\int x^2\operatorname{arsech}(ax)\,dx=
\frac{x^3\operatorname{arsech}(ax)}{3}-
\frac{1}{3a^3}\operatorname{arctan}\sqrt{\frac{1-ax}{1+ax}}-
\frac{x(1+ax)}{6a^2}\sqrt{\frac{1-ax}{1+ax}}+C$$

$$\int x^m\operatorname{arsech}(ax)\,dx=
\frac{x^{m+1}\operatorname{arsech}(ax)}{m+1}+
\frac{1}{m+1}\int\frac{x^m}{(1+ax)\sqrt{\frac{1-ax}{1+ax}}}\,dx\quad(m\ne-1)$$

== Inverse hyperbolic cosecant integration formulas ==
$$\int\operatorname{arcsch}(ax)\,dx=
x\operatorname{arcsch}(ax)+
\frac{1}{a}\operatorname{arcoth}\sqrt{\frac{1}{a^2x^2}+1}+C$$

$$\int x\operatorname{arcsch}(ax)\,dx=
\frac{x^2\operatorname{arcsch}(ax)}{2}+
\frac{x}{2a}\sqrt{\frac{1}{a^2x^2}+1}+C$$

$$\int x^2\operatorname{arcsch}(ax)\,dx=
\frac{x^3\operatorname{arcsch}(ax)}{3}-
\frac{1}{6a^3}\operatorname{arcoth}\sqrt{\frac{1}{a^2x^2}+1}+
\frac{x^2}{6a}\sqrt{\frac{1}{a^2x^2}+1}+C$$

$$\int x^m\operatorname{arcsch}(ax)\,dx=
\frac{x^{m+1}\operatorname{arcsch}(ax)}{m+1}+
\frac{1}{a(m+1)}\int\frac{x^{m-1}}{\sqrt{\frac{1}{a^2x^2}+1}}\,dx\quad(m\ne-1)$$
