= List of multivariable calculus topics =

This is a list of multivariable calculus topics. See also multivariable calculus, vector calculus, list of real analysis topics, list of calculus topics.

- Closed and exact differential forms
- Contact (mathematics)
- Contour integral
- Contour line
- Critical point (mathematics)
- Curl (mathematics)
- Current (mathematics)
- Curvature
- Curvilinear coordinates
- Del
- Differential form
- Differential operator
- Directional derivative
- Divergence
- Divergence theorem
- Double integral
- Equipotential surface
- Euler's theorem on homogeneous functions
- Exterior derivative
- Flux
- Frenet–Serret formulas
- Gauss's law
- Gradient
- Green's theorem
- Green's identities
- Harmonic function
- Helmholtz decomposition
- Hessian matrix
- Hodge star operator
- Inverse function theorem
- Irrotational vector field
- Isoperimetry
- Jacobian matrix
- Lagrange multiplier
- Lamellar vector field
- Laplacian
- Laplacian vector field
- Level set
- Line integral
- Matrix calculus
- Mixed derivatives
- Monkey saddle
- Multiple integral
- Newtonian potential
- Parametric equation
- Parametric surface
- Partial derivative
- Partial differential equation
- Potential
- Real coordinate space
- Saddle point
- Scalar field
- Solenoidal vector field
- Stokes' theorem
- Submersion
- Surface integral
- Symmetry of second derivatives
- Taylor's theorem
- Total derivative
- Vector field
- Vector operator
- Vector potential
