= List of real analysis topics =

This is a list of articles that are considered real analysis topics.

See also: glossary of real and complex analysis.

== General topics ==
=== Limits ===
- Limit of a sequence
  - Subsequential limit – the limit of some subsequence
- Limit of a function (see List of limits for a list of limits of common functions)
  - One-sided limit – either of the two limits of functions of real variables x, as x approaches a point from above or below
  - Squeeze theorem – confirms the limit of a function via comparison with two other functions
  - Big O notation – used to describe the limiting behavior of a function when the argument tends towards a particular value or infinity, usually in terms of simpler functions

=== Sequences and series ===
(see also list of mathematical series)

- Arithmetic progression – a sequence of numbers such that the difference between the consecutive terms is constant
  - Generalized arithmetic progression – a sequence of numbers such that the difference between consecutive terms can be one of several possible constants
- Geometric progression – a sequence of numbers such that each consecutive term is found by multiplying the previous one by a fixed non-zero number
- Harmonic progression – a sequence formed by taking the reciprocals of the terms of an arithmetic progression
- Finite sequence – see sequence
- Infinite sequence – see sequence
- Divergent sequence – see limit of a sequence or divergent series
- Convergent sequence – see limit of a sequence or convergent series
  - Cauchy sequence – a sequence whose elements become arbitrarily close to each other as the sequence progresses
- Convergent series – a series whose sequence of partial sums converges
- Divergent series – a series whose sequence of partial sums diverges
- Power series – a series of the form $f(x) = \sum_{n=0}^\infty a_n \left( x-c \right)^n = a_0 + a_1 (x-c)^1 + a_2 (x-c)^2 + a_3 (x-c)^3 + \cdots$
  - Taylor series – a series of the form $f(a)+\frac {f'(a)}{1!} (x-a)+ \frac{f''(a)}{2!} (x-a)^2+\frac{f^{(3)}(a)}{3!}(x-a)^3+ \cdots.$
    - Maclaurin series – see Taylor series
      - Binomial series – the Maclaurin series of the function f given by f(x) = (1 + x)^{α}
- Telescoping series
- Alternating series
- Geometric series
  - Divergent geometric series
- Harmonic series
- Fourier series
- Lambert series

==== Summation methods ====
- Cesàro summation
- Euler summation
- Lambert summation
- Borel summation
- Summation by parts – transforms the summation of products of into other summations
- Cesàro mean
- Abel's summation formula

==== More advanced topics ====
- Convolution
  - Cauchy product –is the discrete convolution of two sequences
- Farey sequence – the sequence of completely reduced fractions between 0 and 1
- Oscillation – is the behaviour of a sequence of real numbers or a real-valued function, which does not converge, but also does not diverge to +∞ or −∞; and is also a quantitative measure for that.
- Indeterminate forms – algebraic expressions gained in the context of limits. The indeterminate forms include 0^{0}, 0/0, 1^{∞}, ∞ − ∞, ∞/∞, 0 × ∞, and ∞^{0}.

=== Convergence ===
- Pointwise convergence, Uniform convergence
- Absolute convergence, Conditional convergence
- Normal convergence
- Radius of convergence

==== Convergence tests ====
- Integral test for convergence
- Cauchy's convergence test
- Ratio test
- Direct comparison test
- Limit comparison test
- Root test
- Alternating series test
- Dirichlet's test
- Stolz–Cesàro theorem – is a criterion for proving the convergence of a sequence

=== Functions ===
- Function of a real variable
- Real multivariable function
- Continuous function
  - Nowhere continuous function
  - Weierstrass function
- Smooth function
  - Analytic function
    - Quasi-analytic function
  - Non-analytic smooth function
  - Flat function
  - Bump function
- Differentiable function
- Integrable function
  - Square-integrable function, p-integrable function
- Monotonic function
  - Bernstein's theorem on monotone functions – states that any real-valued function on the half-line [0, ∞) that is totally monotone is a mixture of exponential functions
- Inverse function
- Convex function, Concave function
- Singular function
- Harmonic function
  - Weakly harmonic function
  - Proper convex function
- Rational function
- Orthogonal function
- Implicit and explicit functions
  - Implicit function theorem – allows relations to be converted to functions
- Measurable function
- Baire one star function
- Symmetric function
- Domain
- Codomain
  - Image
- Support
- Differential of a function

==== Continuity ====
- Uniform continuity
  - Modulus of continuity
- Lipschitz continuity
- Semi-continuity
- Equicontinuous
- Absolute continuity
- Hölder condition – condition for Hölder continuity

==== Distributions ====
- Dirac delta function
- Heaviside step function
- Hilbert transform
- Green's function

==== Variation ====
- Bounded variation
- Total variation

=== Derivatives ===
- Second derivative
  - Inflection point – found using second derivatives
- Directional derivative, Total derivative, Partial derivative

==== Differentiation rules ====
- Linearity of differentiation
- Product rule
- Quotient rule
- Chain rule
- Inverse function theorem – gives sufficient conditions for a function to be invertible in a neighborhood of a point in its domain, also gives a formula for the derivative of the inverse function

==== Differentiation in geometry and topology ====
see also List of differential geometry topics

- Differentiable manifold
- Differentiable structure
- Submersion – a differentiable map between differentiable manifolds whose differential is everywhere surjective

=== Integrals ===
(see also Lists of integrals)

- Antiderivative
  - Fundamental theorem of calculus – a theorem of antiderivatives
- Multiple integral
- Iterated integral
- Improper integral
  - Cauchy principal value – method for assigning values to certain improper integrals
- Line integral
- Anderson's theorem – says that the integral of an integrable, symmetric, unimodal, non-negative function over an n-dimensional convex body (K) does not decrease if K is translated inwards towards the origin

==== Integration and measure theory ====
see also List of integration and measure theory topics

- Riemann integral, Riemann sum
  - Riemann–Stieltjes integral
- Darboux integral
- Lebesgue integration

== Fundamental theorems ==
- Monotone convergence theorem – relates monotonicity with convergence
- Intermediate value theorem – states that for each value between the least upper bound and greatest lower bound of the image of a continuous function there is at least one point in its domain that the function maps to that value
- Rolle's theorem – essentially states that a differentiable function which attains equal values at two distinct points must have a point somewhere between them where the first derivative is zero
- Mean value theorem – that given an arc of a differentiable curve, there is at least one point on that arc at which the derivative of the curve is equal to the "average" derivative of the arc
- Taylor's theorem – gives an approximation of a $k$ times differentiable function around a given point by a $k$-th order Taylor-polynomial.
- L'Hôpital's rule – uses derivatives to help evaluate limits involving indeterminate forms
- Abel's theorem – relates the limit of a power series to the sum of its coefficients
- Lagrange inversion theorem – gives the Taylor series of the inverse of an analytic function
- Darboux's theorem – states that all functions that result from the differentiation of other functions have the intermediate value property: the image of an interval is also an interval
- Heine–Borel theorem – sometimes used as the defining property of compactness
- Bolzano–Weierstrass theorem – states that each bounded sequence in $\mathbb{R}^{n}$ has a convergent subsequence
- Extreme value theorem - states that if a function $f$ is continuous in the closed and bounded interval $[a,b]$, then it must attain a maximum and a minimum

== Foundational topics ==
=== Numbers ===
==== Real numbers ====
- Construction of the real numbers
  - Natural number
  - Integer
  - Rational number
  - Irrational number
- Completeness of the real numbers
- Least-upper-bound property
- Real line
  - Extended real number line
  - Dedekind cut

==== Specific numbers ====
- 0
- 1
  - 0.999...
- Infinity

=== Sets ===
- Open set
- Neighbourhood
- Cantor set
- Derived set (mathematics)
- Completeness
- Limit superior and limit inferior
  - Supremum
  - Infimum
- Interval
  - Partition of an interval

=== Maps ===
- Contraction mapping
- Metric map
- Fixed point – a point of a function that maps to itself

== Applied mathematical tools ==
=== Infinite expressions ===
- Continued fraction
- Series
- Infinite products

=== Inequalities ===
See list of inequalities

- Triangle inequality
- Bernoulli's inequality
- Cauchy–Schwarz inequality
- Hölder's inequality
- Minkowski inequality
- Jensen's inequality
- Chebyshev's inequality
- Inequality of arithmetic and geometric means

=== Means ===
- Generalized mean
- Pythagorean means
  - Arithmetic mean
  - Geometric mean
  - Harmonic mean
- Geometric–harmonic mean
- Arithmetic–geometric mean
- Weighted mean
- Quasi-arithmetic mean

=== Orthogonal polynomials ===
- Classical orthogonal polynomials
  - Hermite polynomials
  - Laguerre polynomials
  - Jacobi polynomials
  - Gegenbauer polynomials
  - Legendre polynomials

=== Spaces ===
- Euclidean space
- Metric space
  - Banach fixed point theorem – guarantees the existence and uniqueness of fixed points of certain self-maps of metric spaces, provides method to find them
  - Complete metric space
- Topological space
  - Function space
    - Sequence space
- Compact space

=== Measures ===
- Lebesgue measure
- Outer measure
  - Hausdorff measure
- Dominated convergence theorem – provides sufficient conditions under which two limit processes commute, namely Lebesgue integration and almost everywhere convergence of a sequence of functions.

=== Field of sets ===
- Sigma-algebra

== Historical figures ==
- Michel Rolle (1652–1719)
- Brook Taylor (1685–1731)
- Leonhard Euler (1707–1783)
- Joseph-Louis Lagrange (1736–1813)
- Joseph Fourier (1768–1830)
- Bernard Bolzano (1781–1848)
- Augustin Cauchy (1789–1857)
- Niels Henrik Abel (1802–1829)
- Peter Gustav Lejeune Dirichlet (1805–1859)
- Karl Weierstrass (1815–1897)
- Eduard Heine (1821–1881)
- Pafnuty Chebyshev (1821–1894)
- Leopold Kronecker (1823–1891)
- Bernhard Riemann (1826–1866)
- Richard Dedekind (1831–1916)
- Rudolf Lipschitz (1832–1903)
- Camille Jordan (1838–1922)
- Jean Gaston Darboux (1842–1917)
- Georg Cantor (1845–1918)
- Ernesto Cesàro (1859–1906)
- Otto Hölder (1859–1937)
- Hermann Minkowski (1864–1909)
- Alfred Tauber (1866–1942)
- Felix Hausdorff (1868–1942)
- Émile Borel (1871–1956)
- Henri Lebesgue (1875–1941)
- Wacław Sierpiński (1882–1969)
- Johann Radon (1887–1956)
- Karl Menger (1902–1985)

== Related fields of analysis ==
- Asymptotic analysis – studies a method of describing limiting behaviour
- Convex analysis – studies the properties of convex functions and convex sets
  - List of convexity topics
- Harmonic analysis – studies the representation of functions or signals as superpositions of basic waves
  - List of harmonic analysis topics
- Fourier analysis – studies Fourier series and Fourier transforms
  - List of Fourier analysis topics
  - List of Fourier-related transforms
- Complex analysis – studies the extension of real analysis to include complex numbers
- Functional analysis – studies vector spaces endowed with limit-related structures and the linear operators acting upon these spaces
- Nonstandard analysis – studies mathematical analysis using a rigorous treatment of infinitesimals.

== See also ==
- Calculus, the classical calculus of Newton and Leibniz.
- Non-standard calculus, a rigorous application of infinitesimals, in the sense of non-standard analysis, to the classical calculus of Newton and Leibniz.
