= David Bierens de Haan =

Dutch mathematician and historian of science

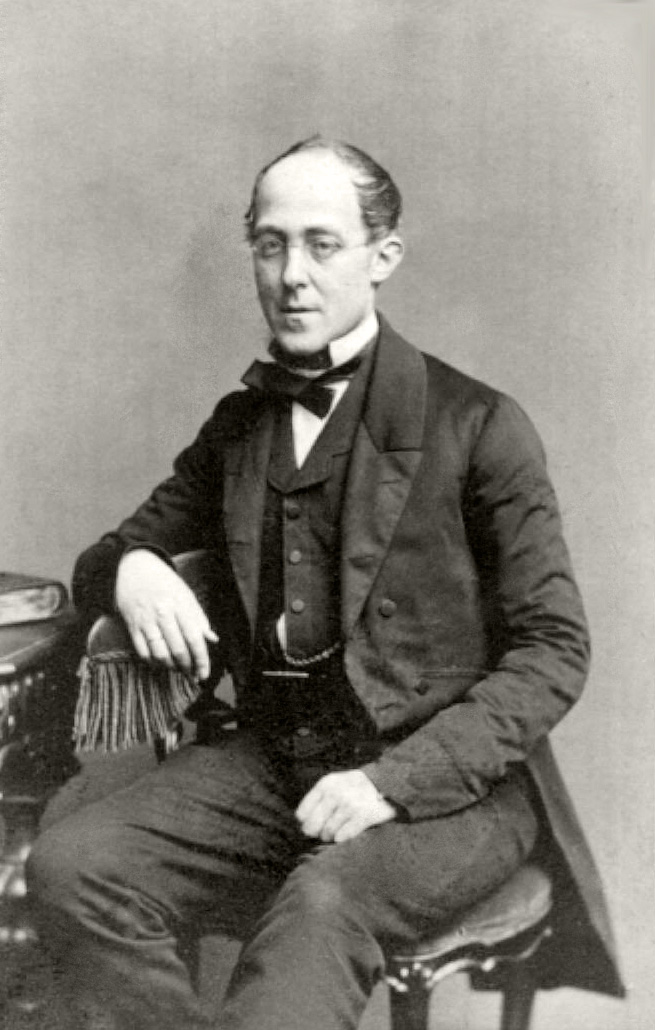
David Bierens de Haan

David Bierens de Haan (3 May 1822, in Amsterdam – 12 August 1895, in Leiden) was a Dutch mathematician and historian of science.

== Biography ==
Bierens de Haan was a son of the rich merchant Abraham Pieterszoon de Haan (1795–1880) and Catharina Jacoba Bierens (1797–1835). In 1843 he completed a study in the exact sciences and received his PhD from the University of Leiden in 1847 under Gideon Janus Verdam (1802–1866) for the work De Lemniscata Bernouillana. After this he became a teacher of physics and mathematics at a gymnasium in Deventer. In 1852 he married Johanna Catharina Justina IJssel de Schepper (1827–1906) in Deventer.

In 1856 he became member of the Royal Netherlands Academy of Arts and Sciences. Since 1866 he was professor of mathematics at Leiden University. Since 1888 he was co-editor of the works of Christiaan Huygens and in 1892 edited the Algebra of Willem Smaasen (1820–1850).

He had a large library on mathematics, the history of science and pedagogy, which currently resides at the Leiden University Library.

His most important contribution to mathematics consist of the issuing of a large table of integrals (Nouvelles) tables d'intégrales définies in 1858 (and 1867). His doctoral students include Pieter Hendrik Schoute.

== Works ==
- Dissertatio Mathematica inauguralis de lemniscata Bernoulliana. Amsterdam 1847 (Online)
- De wiskunde als gedeelte van het onderwijs op gymnasiën. 1850
- Réduction des intégrales définies générales. Amsterdam 1857 (Online)
- Tables d'intégrales définies. Amsterdam 1858, Verhandelingen Koninklijke Akademie Wetenschappen, C. G. van der Post (Online)
- Gronden van de theorie der bepaalde integralen. 1858
- Over eenige gevallen bij de Theorie van onstadige (Discontinuë) functiën. Amsterdam 1858 (Online)
- Mémoire sur une méthode pour deduire quelques intégrales définies. 1860 (Online)
- Exposé de la théorie, des propriétés, des formules de transformation et des méthodes d'évaluation des intégrales définies. 1860, 1862
- Het industrieel onderwijs. 1861
- Supplément aux tables d'intégrales définies qui forment le tome IV des mémoires de l'académie. 1864 [1861] (Online)
- Vorderingen in de photographische afbeelding van hemelligchamen. 1862
- Over de magt van het zoogenaamd onbestaanbare in de wiskunde. Deventer 1863 (Online)
- Overzigt van de differentiaalrekening. Leiden 1865 (Online)
- G. J. Verdam. 1866 (Online)
- Nouvelles tables d'intégrales définies. Leiden 1867, P. Engels (Online) (Online) (David Bierens de Haan at the Internet Archive)
- Het biljart. Leiden 1870 (Online)
- Feestviering ter eere van het vierhonderd-jarig bestaan der Ludwig ... . 1872 (Online)
- Notice sur Meindert Semeyns. 1873
- Notice sur des tables logarithmiques hollandaises. 1874
- Over het differentieeren van eenige elliptische integralen. 1878
- Levensschets van Carel Johannes Matthes. 1882
- Levensschets van Isaac Paul Delprat. 1882
- Een aanhangsel tot de tafels van onbepaalde integralen. 1883, 2. Bde.
- Bouwstoffen voor de geschiedenis der wis- en natuurkundige wetenschappen in de Nederlanden. 1878–1887, 2. Bde.
- Bibliographie néerlandaise historique-scientifique des ouvrages importants dont les auteurs sont nés aux 16e, 17e et 18e siècles, sur les sciences mathématiques et physiques avec leurs applications. 1883 (Online)
- Levensbericht van F. J. van den Berg, en lijst zijner geschriften. 1895
