= List of integrals of exponential functions =

The following is a list of integrals of exponential functions. For a complete list of integral functions, please see the list of integrals.

== Indefinite integral ==
Indefinite integrals are antiderivative functions. A constant (the constant of integration) may be added to the right hand side of any of these formulas, but has been suppressed here in the interest of brevity.

=== Integrals of polynomials ===
- $\int xe^{cx}\,dx = e^{cx}\left(\frac{cx-1}{c^{2}}\right) \qquad \text{ for } c \neq 0;$
- $\int x^2 e^{cx}\,dx = e^{cx}\left(\frac{x^2}{c}-\frac{2x}{c^2}+\frac{2}{c^3}\right)$
- $$\begin{align}
\int x^n e^{cx}\,dx &= \frac{1}{c} x^n e^{cx} - \frac{n}{c}\int x^{n-1} e^{cx} \,dx \\
&= \left( \frac{\partial}{\partial c} \right)^n \frac{e^{cx}}{c} \\
&= e^{cx}\sum_{i=0}^n (-1)^i\frac{n!}{(n-i)!c^{i+1}}x^{n-i} \\
&= e^{cx}\sum_{i=0}^n (-1)^{n-i}\frac{n!}{i!c^{n-i+1}}x^i
\end{align}$$
- $\int\frac{e^{cx}}{x}\,dx = \ln|x| +\sum_{n=1}^\infty\frac{(cx)^n}{n\cdot n!}$
- $\int\frac{e^{cx}}{x^n}\,dx = \frac{1}{n-1}\left(-\frac{e^{cx}}{x^{n-1}}+c\int\frac{e^{cx} }{x^{n-1}}\,dx\right) \qquad\text{(for }n\neq 1\text{)}$

=== Integrals involving only exponential functions ===
- $\int f'(x)e^{f(x)}\,dx = e^{f(x)}$
- $\int e^{cx}\,dx = \frac{1}{c} e^{cx}$
- $\int a^{x}\,dx = \frac{a^x}{\ln a}\qquad\text{ for }a > 0,\ a \ne 1$

=== Integrals involving the error function ===
In the following formulas, erf is the error function and Ei is the exponential integral.

- $\int e^{cx}\ln x\,dx = \frac{1}{c}\left(e^{cx}\ln|x|-\operatorname{Ei}(cx)\right)$
- $\int x e^{c x^2 }\,dx= \frac{1}{2c} e^{c x^2}$
- $\int e^{-c x^2 }\,dx= \sqrt{\frac{\pi}{4c}} \operatorname{erf}(\sqrt{c} x)$
- $\int xe^{-c x^2 }\,dx=-\frac{1}{2c}e^{-cx^2}$
- $\int\frac{e^{-x^2}}{x^2}\,dx = -\frac{e^{-x^2}}{x} - \sqrt{\pi} \operatorname{erf} (x)$
- $\int {\frac{1}{\sigma\sqrt{2\pi}} e^{ -\frac{1}{2}\left(\frac{x-\mu}{\sigma}\right)^2 }}\,dx= \frac{1}{2}\operatorname{erf}\left(\frac{x-\mu}{\sigma \sqrt{2}}\right)$

=== Other integrals ===
- $\int e^{x^2}\,dx = e^{x^2}\left( \sum_{j=0}^{n-1}c_{2j}\frac{1}{x^{2j+1}} \right )+(2n-1)c_{2n-2} \int \frac{e^{x^2}}{x^{2n}}\,dx \quad \text{valid for any } n > 0,$
  where $c_{2j}=\frac{ 1 \cdot 3 \cdot 5 \cdots (2j-1)}{2^{j+1}}=\frac{(2j)!}{j!2^{2j+1}} \ .$

(Note that the value of the expression is independent of the value of n, which is why it does not appear in the integral.)

- ${\int \underbrace{x^{x^{\cdot^{\cdot^{x}}}}}_mdx= \sum_{n=0}^m\frac{(-1)^n(n+1)^{n-1}}{n!}\Gamma(n+1,- \ln x) + \sum_{n=m+1}^\infty(-1)^na_{mn}\Gamma(n+1,-\ln x) \qquad\text{(for }x> 0\text{)}}$

where
$$a_{mn}=\begin{cases}1   &\text{if } n = 0, \\ \\ \dfrac{1}{n!} &\text{if } m=1, \\ \\ \dfrac{1}{n}\sum_{j=1}^{n}ja_{m,n-j}a_{m-1,j-1}  &\text{otherwise} \end{cases}$$

and Γ(x,y) is the upper incomplete gamma function.

- $\int \frac{1}{ae^{\lambda x} + b} \,dx = \frac{x}{b} - \frac{1}{b \lambda} \ln\left(a e^{\lambda x} + b \right)$ when $b \neq 0$, $\lambda \neq 0$, and $ae^{\lambda x} + b > 0.$
- $\int \frac{e^{2\lambda x}}{ae^{\lambda x} + b} \,dx = \frac{1}{a^2 \lambda} \left[a e^{\lambda x} + b - b \ln\left(a e^{\lambda x} + b \right) \right]$ when $a \neq 0$, $\lambda \neq 0$, and $ae^{\lambda x} + b > 0.$
- $\int \frac{ae^{cx}-1}{be^{cx}-1}\,dx=\frac{(a-b)\log(1-be^{cx})}{bc}+x.$
- $\int{e^{x}\left( f\left( x \right) + f'\left( x \right) \right)\text{dx}} = e^{x}f\left( x \right) + C$
- $\int {e^{x}\left( f\left( x \right) - \left( - 1 \right)^{n}\frac{d^{n}f\left( x \right)}{dx^{n}} \right)\,dx} = e^{x}\sum_{k = 1}^{n}{\left( - 1 \right)^{k - 1}\frac{d^{k - 1}f\left( x \right)}{dx^{k - 1}}} + C$
- $\int {e^{- x}\left( f\left( x \right) - \frac{d^{n}f\left( x \right)}{dx^{n}} \right)\, dx} = - e^{- x}\sum_{k = 1}^{n}\frac{d^{k - 1}f\left( x \right)}{dx^{k - 1}} + C$
- $\int {e^{ax}\left( \left( a\right)^{n}f\left( x \right) - \left( - 1 \right)^{n}\frac{d^{n}f\left( x \right)}{dx^{n}} \right)\,dx} = e^{ax}\sum_{k = 1}^{n}{\left(a\right)^{n-k}\left( - 1 \right)^{k - 1}\frac{d^{k - 1}f\left( x \right)}{dx^{k - 1}}} + C$

== Definite integrals ==
- $$\begin{align}
\int_0^1 e^{x\cdot \ln a + (1-x)\cdot \ln b}\,dx
&= \int_0^1 \left(\frac{a}{b}\right)^{x}\cdot b\,dx \\
&= \int_0^1 a^{x}\cdot b^{1-x}\,dx \\
&= \frac{a-b}{\ln a - \ln b} \qquad\text{for } a > 0,\ b > 0,\ a \neq b
\end{align}$$

The last expression is the logarithmic mean.

- $\int_0^{\infty} e^{-ax}\,dx=\frac{1}{a} \quad (\operatorname{Re}(a)>0)$
- $\int_0^{\infty} e^{-ax^2}\,dx=\frac{1}{2} \sqrt{\pi \over a} \quad (a>0)$ (the Gaussian integral)
- $\int_{-\infty}^{\infty} e^{-ax^2}\,dx=\sqrt{\pi \over a} \quad (a>0)$
- $\int_{-\infty}^{\infty} e^{-ax^2} e^{-\frac{b}{x^2}}\,dx=\sqrt{\frac{\pi}{a}}e^{-2\sqrt{ab}} \quad (a,b>0)$
- $\int_{-\infty}^{\infty} e^{-(ax^2 + bx)}\,dx= \sqrt{\pi \over a}e^{\tfrac{b^2}{4a}} \quad(a > 0)$ (see Integral of a Gaussian function)
- $\int_{-\infty}^{\infty} e^{-(ax^2 + bx+c)}\,dx= \sqrt{\pi \over a}e^{\tfrac{b^2}{4a}-c} \quad(a > 0)$
- $\int_{-\infty}^{\infty} x e^{-a(x-b)^2}\,dx= b \sqrt{\frac{\pi}{a}} \quad (\operatorname{Re}(a)>0)$
- $\int_{-\infty}^{\infty} x e^{-ax^2+bx}\,dx= \frac{ \sqrt{\pi} b }{2a^{3/2}} e^{\frac{b^2}{4a}} \quad (\operatorname{Re}(a)>0)$
- $\int_{-\infty}^{\infty} x^2 e^{-ax^2}\,dx=\frac{1}{2} \sqrt{\pi \over a^3} \quad (a>0)$
- $\int_{-\infty}^{\infty} x^2 e^{-(ax^2+bx)}\,dx=\frac{\sqrt{\pi}(2a+b^2)}{4a^{5/2}} e^{\frac{b^2}{4a}} \quad (\operatorname{Re}(a)>0)$
- $\int_{-\infty}^{\infty} x^3 e^{-(ax^2+bx)}\,dx=\frac{\sqrt{\pi}(6a+b^2)b}{8a^{7/2}} e^{\frac{b^2}{4a}} \quad (\operatorname{Re}(a)>0)$
- $$\int_0^{\infty} x^{n} e^{-ax^2}\,dx =
\begin{cases}
\dfrac{\Gamma \left(\frac{n+1}{2}\right)}{2 a^\frac{n+1}{2} } & (n>-1,\ a>0) \\
\dfrac{(2k-1)!!}{2^{k+1}a^k}\sqrt{\dfrac{\pi}{a}} & (n=2k,\ k \text{ integer},\ a>0) \\
\dfrac{k!}{2(a^{k+1})} & (n=2k+1,\ k \text{ integer},\ a>0)
\end{cases}$$

(the operator $!!$ is the Double factorial)

- $$\int_0^{\infty} x^n e^{-ax}\,dx =
\begin{cases}
\dfrac{\Gamma(n+1)}{a^{n+1}} & (n>-1,\ \operatorname{Re}(a)>0) \\ \\
\dfrac{n!}{a^{n+1}} & (n=0,1,2,\ldots,\ \operatorname{Re}(a)>0)
\end{cases}$$
- $\int_0^{1} x^n e^{-ax}\,dx = \frac{n!}{a^{n+1}}\left[1-e^{-a}\sum_{i=0}^{n} \frac{a^i}{i!}\right]$
- $\int_0^{b} x^n e^{-ax}\,dx = \frac{n!}{a^{n+1}}\left[1-e^{-ab}\sum_{i=0}^{n} \frac{(ab)^i}{i!}\right]$
- $\int_0^\infty e^{-ax^b} dx = \frac{1}{b}\ a^{-\frac{1}{b}}\Gamma\left(\frac{1}{b}\right)$
- $\int_0^\infty x^n e^{-ax^b} dx = \frac{1}{b}\ a^{-\frac{n+1}{b}}\Gamma\left(\frac{n+1}{b}\right)$
- $\int_0^{\infty} e^{-ax}\sin bx\,dx = \frac{b}{a^2+b^2} \quad (a>0)$
- $\int_0^{\infty} e^{-ax}\cos bx\,dx = \frac{a}{a^2+b^2} \quad (a>0)$
- $\int_0^{\infty} xe^{-ax}\sin bx\,dx = \frac{2ab}{(a^2+b^2)^2} \quad (a>0)$
- $\int_0^{\infty} xe^{-ax}\cos bx\,dx = \frac{a^2-b^2}{(a^2+b^2)^2} \quad (a>0)$
- $\int_0^{\infty} \frac{e^{-ax}\sin bx}{x}\,dx=\arctan \frac{b}{a}$
- $\int_0^{\infty} \frac{e^{-ax}-e^{-bx}}{x}\,dx=\ln \frac{b}{a}$
- $\int_0^{\infty} \frac{e^{-ax}-e^{-bx}}{x} \sin px \, dx=\arctan \frac{b}{p} - \arctan \frac{a}{p}$
- $\int_0^{\infty} \frac{e^{-ax}-e^{-bx}}{x} \cos px \, dx=\frac{1}{2} \ln \frac{b^2+p^2}{a^2+p^2}$
- $\int_0^{\infty} \frac{e^{-ax} (1-\cos x)}{x^2}\,dx=\arccot a - \frac{a}{2}\ln \Big(\frac{1}{a^2}+1\Big)$
- $\int_{-\infty}^\infty e^{a x^4+b x^3+c x^2+d x+f} \, dx = e^f \sum_{n,m,p=0}^\infty \frac{ b^{4n}}{(4n)!} \frac{c^{2m}}{(2m)!} \frac{d^{4p}}{(4p)!} \frac{ \Gamma(3n+m+p+\frac14) }{a^{3n+m+p+\frac14} }$ (appears in several models of extended superstring theory in higher dimensions)
- $\int_0^{2 \pi} e^{x \cos \theta} d \theta = 2 \pi I_0(x)$ (I_{0} is the modified Bessel function of the first kind)
- $\int_0^{2 \pi} e^{x \cos \theta + y \sin \theta} d \theta = 2 \pi I_0 \left( \sqrt{x^2 + y^2} \right)$
- $\int_0^\infty\frac{x^{s-1}}{e^x/z-1} \,dx = \operatorname{Li}_{s}(z)\Gamma(s),$

where $\operatorname{Li}_{s}(z)$ is the Polylogarithm.

- $\int_0^\infty\frac{\sin mx}{e^{2 \pi x}-1} \,dx = \frac{1}{4} \coth \frac{m}{2} - \frac{1}{2m}$
- $\int_0^\infty e^{-x} \ln x\, dx = - \gamma,$

where $\gamma$ is the Euler–Mascheroni constant which equals the value of a number of definite integrals.

Finally, a well known result,
$$\int_0^{2 \pi} e^{i(m-n)\phi} d\phi = 2 \pi \delta_{m,n} \qquad\text{for }m,n\in\mathbb{Z}$$
where $\delta_{m,n}$ is the Kronecker delta.

== See also ==
- Gradshteyn and Ryzhik
