= List of integrals of rational functions =

The following is a list of integrals (antiderivative functions) of rational functions. Any rational function can be integrated by partial fraction decomposition of the function into a sum of functions of the form:

$\frac{a}{(x-b)^n}$, and $\frac{ax + b}{\left((x-c)^2+d^2\right)^n}.$

which can then be integrated term by term.

For other types of functions that can be integrated, see lists of integrals.

== Miscellaneous integrands ==
- $\int\frac{f'(x)}{f(x)} \, dx= \ln\left| f(x)\right| + C$
- $\int\frac{1}{x^2+a^2} \, dx = \frac{1}{a}\arctan\frac{x}{a}\,\! + C$
- $$\int\frac{1}{x^2-a^2} \, dx = \frac{1}{2a}\ln\left|\frac{x-a}{x+a}\right| + C = \begin{cases} \displaystyle -\frac{1}{a}\,\operatorname{artanh}\frac{x}{a} + C = \frac{1}{2a}\ln\frac{a-x}{a+x} + C  & \text{(for }|x| < |a|\mbox{)} \\[12pt] \displaystyle -\frac{1}{a}\,\operatorname{arcoth}\frac{x}{a} + C = \frac{1}{2a}\ln\frac{x-a}{x+a} + C & \text{(for }|x| > |a| \mbox{)} \end{cases}$$
- $$\int\frac{1}{a^2-x^2} \, dx = \frac{1}{2a}\ln\left|\frac{a+x}{a-x}\right| + C = \begin{cases} \displaystyle \frac{1}{a}\,\operatorname{artanh}\frac{x}{a} + C = \frac{1}{2a}\ln\frac{a+x}{a-x} + C  & \text{(for }|x| < |a|\mbox{)} \\[12pt] \displaystyle \frac{1}{a}\,\operatorname{arcoth}\frac{x}{a} + C = \frac{1}{2a}\ln\frac{x+a}{x-a} + C & \text{(for }|x| > |a| \mbox{)} \end{cases}$$
- $\int \frac{1}{x^{2^n} + 1}\, dx = \frac{1}{2^{n-1}}\sum_{k=1}^{2^{n-1}} \sin \left(\frac{2k -1}{2^n}\pi\right) \arctan\left[\left(x - \cos \left(\frac{2k -1}{2^n}\pi \right) \right ) \csc \left(\frac{2k -1}{2^n}\pi \right) \right] - \frac{1}{2} \cos \left(\frac{2k -1}{2^n}\pi \right) \ln \left | x^2 - 2 x \cos \left(\frac{2k -1}{2^n}\pi \right) + 1 \right | + C$

== Integrands of the form x^{m}(a x + b)^{n} ==
Many of the following antiderivatives have a term of the form ln |ax + b|. Because this is undefined when x = −b / a, the most general form of the antiderivative replaces the constant of integration with a locally constant function. However, it is conventional to omit this from the notation. For example,
$$\int\frac{1}{ax + b} \, dx= \begin{cases}
\dfrac{1}{a}\ln(-(ax + b)) + C^- & ax+b<0 \\
\dfrac{1}{a}\ln(ax + b) + C^+ & ax+b>0
\end{cases}$$
is usually abbreviated as
$$\int\frac{1}{ax + b} \, dx= \frac{1}{a}\ln\left|ax + b\right| + C,$$
where C is to be understood as notation for a locally constant function of x. This convention will be adhered to in the following.

- $\int (ax + b)^n \, dx= \frac{(ax + b)^{n+1}}{a(n + 1)} + C \qquad\text{(for } n\neq -1\mbox{)}$ (Cavalieri's quadrature formula)
- $\int x^{a-1} (1-x)^{b-1} \, dx= \Beta(x;\,a,b) + C \qquad\text{(for } \operatorname{Re}(a), \operatorname{Re}(b)>0\mbox{)}$ (Incomplete beta function)
- $\int\frac{x}{ax + b} \, dx= \frac{x}{a} - \frac{b}{a^2}\ln\left|ax + b\right| + C$
- $\int\frac{mx + n}{ax + b} \, dx= \frac{m}{a} x + \frac{an - bm}{a^2}\ln\left|ax + b\right| + C$
- $\int\frac{x}{(ax + b)^2} \, dx= \frac{b}{a^2(ax + b)} + \frac{1}{a^2}\ln\left|ax + b\right| + C$
- $\int\frac{x}{(ax + b)^n} \, dx= \frac{a(1 - n)x - b}{a^2(n - 1)(n - 2)(ax + b)^{n-1}} + C \qquad\text{(for } n\not\in \{1, 2\}\mbox{)}$
- $\int x(ax + b)^n \, dx= \frac{a(n + 1)x - b}{a^2(n + 1)(n + 2)} (ax + b)^{n+1} + C \qquad\text{(for }n \not\in \{-1, -2\}\mbox{)}$
- $\int\frac{x^2}{ax + b} \, dx= \frac{b^2\ln(\left|ax + b\right|)}{a^3}+\frac{ax^2 - 2bx}{2a^2} + C$
- $\int\frac{x^2}{(ax + b)^2} \, dx= \frac{1}{a^3}\left(ax - 2b\ln\left|ax + b\right| - \frac{b^2}{ax + b}\right) + C$
- $\int\frac{x^2}{(ax + b)^3} \, dx= \frac{1}{a^3}\left(\ln\left|ax + b\right| + \frac{2b}{ax + b} - \frac{b^2}{2(ax + b)^2}\right) + C$
- $\int\frac{x^2}{(ax + b)^n} \, dx= \frac{1}{a^3}\left(-\frac{(ax + b)^{3-n}}{(n-3)} + \frac{2b (ax + b)^{2-n}}{(n-2)} - \frac{b^2 (ax + b)^{1-n}}{(n - 1)}\right) + C \qquad\text{(for } n\not\in \{1, 2, 3\}\mbox{)}$
- $\int\frac{1}{x(ax + b)} \, dx = -\frac{1}{b}\ln\left|\frac{ax+b}{x}\right| + C$
- $\int\frac{1}{x^2(ax+b)} \, dx = -\frac{1}{bx} + \frac{a}{b^2}\ln\left|\frac{ax+b}{x}\right| + C$
- $\int\frac{1}{x^2(ax+b)^2} \, dx = -a\left(\frac{1}{b^2(ax+b)} + \frac{1}{ab^2x} - \frac{2}{b^3}\ln\left|\frac{ax+b}{x}\right|\right) + C$

== Integrands of the form x^{m} / (a x^{2} + b x + c)^{n} ==
For $a\neq 0:$

- $$\int\frac{1}{ax^2+bx+c} dx =
\begin{cases}
\displaystyle \frac{2}{\sqrt{4ac-b^2}}\arctan\frac{2ax+b}{\sqrt{4ac-b^2}} + C & \text{(for }4ac-b^2>0\mbox{)} \\[12pt]
\displaystyle \frac{1}{\sqrt{b^2-4ac}}\ln\left|\frac{2ax+b-\sqrt{b^2-4ac}}{2ax+b+\sqrt{b^2-4ac}}\right| + C =
\begin{cases}
\displaystyle -\frac{2}{\sqrt{b^2-4ac}}\,\operatorname{artanh}\frac{2ax+b}{\sqrt{b^2-4ac}} + C &\text{(for }|2ax+b|<\sqrt{b^2-4ac}\mbox{)} \\[6pt]
\displaystyle -\frac{2}{\sqrt{b^2-4ac}}\,\operatorname{arcoth}\frac{2ax+b}{\sqrt{b^2-4ac}} + C &\text{(else)}
\end{cases}
& \text{(for }4ac-b^2<0\mbox{)} \\[12pt]
\displaystyle -\frac{2}{2ax+b} + C & \text{(for }4ac-b^2=0\mbox{)}
\end{cases}$$
- $\int\frac{x}{ax^2+bx+c} \, dx = \frac{1}{2a}\ln\left|ax^2+bx+c\right|-\frac{b}{2a}\int\frac{dx}{ax^2+bx+c} + C$
- $$\int\frac{mx+n}{ax^2+bx+c} \, dx = \begin{cases}
\displaystyle \frac{m}{2a}\ln\left|ax^2+bx+c\right|+\frac{2an-bm}{a\sqrt{4ac-b^2}}\arctan\frac{2ax+b}{\sqrt{4ac-b^2}} + C &\text{(for }4ac-b^2>0\mbox{)} \\[12pt] \displaystyle \frac{m}{2a}\ln\left|ax^2+bx+c\right|+\frac{2an-bm}{2a\sqrt{b^2-4ac}}\ln\left|\frac{2ax+b-\sqrt{b^2-4ac}}{2ax+b+\sqrt{b^2-4ac}}\right| + C =
\begin{cases}
\displaystyle \frac{m}{2a}\ln\left|ax^2+bx+c\right|-\frac{2an-bm}{a\sqrt{b^2-4ac}}\,\operatorname{artanh}\frac{2ax+b}{\sqrt{b^2-4ac}} + C &\text{(for }|2ax+b|<\sqrt{b^2-4ac}\mbox{)} \\[6pt]
\displaystyle \frac{m}{2a}\ln\left|ax^2+bx+c\right|-\frac{2an-bm}{a\sqrt{b^2-4ac}}\,\operatorname{arcoth}\frac{2ax+b}{\sqrt{b^2-4ac}} + C &\text{(else)}
\end{cases}
& \text{(for }4ac-b^2<0\mbox{)} \\[12pt]
\displaystyle \frac{m}{2a}\ln\left|ax^2+bx+c\right|-\frac{2an-bm}{a(2ax+b)} + C = \frac{m}{a}\ln\left|x+\frac{b}{2a}\right|-\frac{2an-bm}{a(2ax+b)} + C &\text{(for }4ac-b^2=0\mbox{)}\end{cases}$$
- $\int\frac{1}{(ax^2+bx+c)^n} \, dx= \frac{2ax+b}{(n-1)(4ac-b^2)(ax^2+bx+c)^{n-1}}+\frac{(2n-3)2a}{(n-1)(4ac-b^2)}\int\frac{1}{(ax^2+bx+c)^{n-1}} \, dx + C$
- $\int\frac{x}{(ax^2+bx+c)^n} \, dx= -\frac{bx+2c}{(n-1)(4ac-b^2)(ax^2+bx+c)^{n-1}}-\frac{b(2n-3)}{(n-1)(4ac-b^2)}\int\frac{1}{(ax^2+bx+c)^{n-1}} \, dx + C$
- $\int\frac{1}{x(ax^2+bx+c)} \, dx= \frac{1}{2c}\ln\left|\frac{x^2}{ax^2+bx+c}\right|-\frac{b}{2c}\int\frac{1}{ax^2+bx+c} \, dx + C$

== Integrands of the form x^{m} (a + b x^{n})^{p} ==
- The resulting integrands are of the same form as the original integrand, so these reduction formulas can be repeatedly applied to drive the exponents m and p toward 0.
- These reduction formulas can be used for integrands having integer and/or fractional exponents.
- $\int x^m \left(a+b\,x^n\right)^p dx = \frac{x^{m+1} \left(a+b\,x^n\right)^p}{m+n\,p+1}\,+\, \frac{a\,n\,p}{m+n\,p+1}\int x^m \left(a+b\,x^n\right)^{p-1}dx$
- $\int x^m \left(a+b\,x^n\right)^p dx = -\frac{x^{m+1} \left(a+b\,x^n\right)^{p+1}}{a\,n (p+1)}\,+\, \frac{m+n (p+1)+1}{a\,n (p+1)}\int x^m \left(a+b\,x^n\right)^{p+1}dx$
- $\int x^m \left(a+b\,x^n\right)^p dx = \frac{x^{m+1} \left(a+b\,x^n\right)^p}{m+1}\,-\, \frac{b\,n\,p}{m+1}\int x^{m+n} \left(a+b\,x^n\right)^{p-1}dx$
- $\int x^m \left(a+b\,x^n\right)^p dx = \frac{x^{m-n+1} \left(a+b\,x^n\right)^{p+1}}{b\,n (p+1)}\,-\, \frac{m-n+1}{b\,n (p+1)}\int x^{m-n} \left(a+b\,x^n\right)^{p+1}dx$
- $\int x^m \left(a+b\,x^n\right)^p dx = \frac{x^{m-n+1} \left(a+b\,x^n\right)^{p+1}}{b (m+n\,p+1)}\,-\, \frac{a (m-n+1)}{b (m+n\,p+1)}\int x^{m-n}\left(a+b\,x^n\right)^pdx$
- $\int x^m \left(a+b\,x^n\right)^p dx = \frac{x^{m+1} \left(a+b\,x^n\right)^{p+1}}{a (m+1)}\,-\, \frac{b (m+n (p+1)+1)}{a (m+1)}\int x^{m+n}\left(a+b\,x^n\right)^pdx$

== Integrands of the form (A + B x) (a + b x)^{m} (c + d x)^{n} (e + f x)^{p} ==
- The resulting integrands are of the same form as the original integrand, so these reduction formulas can be repeatedly applied to drive the exponents m, n and p toward 0.
- These reduction formulas can be used for integrands having integer and/or fractional exponents.
- Special cases of these reductions formulas can be used for integrands of the form $(a+b\,x)^m (c+d\,x)^n (e+f\,x)^p$ by setting B to 0.
- $$\begin{align}
&\int (A+B\,x) (a+b\,x)^m (c+d\,x)^n (e+f\,x)^p dx=
-\frac{(A\,b-a\,B)(a+b\,x)^{m+1} (c+d\,x)^n(e+f\,x)^{p+1}}{b (m+1) (a\,f-b\,e)}\,+\,
\frac{1}{b (m+1) (a\,f-b\,e)}\,\cdot \\
&\qquad \int (b\,c(m+1) (A\,f-B\,e)+(A\,b-a\,B) (n\,d\,e+c\,f(p+1))+d(b(m+1) (A\,f-B\,e)+f(n+p+1) (A\,b-a\,B))x)(a+b\,x)^{m+1} (c+d\,x)^{n-1}(e+f\,x)^p dx
\end{align}$$
- $$\begin{align}
&\int (A+B\,x) (a+b\,x)^m (c+d\,x)^n (e+f\,x)^p dx=
\frac{B(a+b\,x)^m (c+d\,x)^{n+1}(e+f\,x)^{p+1}}{d\,f(m+n+p+2)}\,+\,
\frac{1}{d\,f(m+n+p+2)}\,\cdot \\
&\qquad \int (A\,a\,d\,f(m+n+p+2)-B (b\,c\,e\,m+a(d\,e(n+1)+c\,f(p+1)))+(A\,b\,d\,f(m+n+p+2)+B (a\,d\,f\,m-b(d\,e(m+n+1)+c\,f(m+p+1)))) x)(a+b\,x)^{m-1} (c+d\,x)^n(e+f\,x)^p dx
\end{align}$$
- $$\begin{align}
&\int (A+B\,x) (a+b\,x)^m (c+d\,x)^n (e+f\,x)^p dx=
\frac{(A\,b-a\,B)(a+b\,x)^{m+1} (c+d\,x)^{n+1}(e+f\,x)^{p+1}}{(m+1)(a\,d-b\,c)(a\,f-b\,e)}\,+\,
\frac{1}{(m+1)(a\,d-b\,c)(a\,f-b\,e)}\,\cdot \\
&\qquad \int ((m+1) (A (a\,d\,f-b(c\,f+d\,e))+B\,b\,c\,e)-(A\,b-a\,B) (d\,e(n+1)+c\,f(p+1))-d\,f(m+n+p+3) (A\,b-a\,B)x)(a+b\,x)^{m+1} (c+d\,x)^n(e+f\,x)^p dx
\end{align}$$

== Integrands of the form x^{m} (A + B x^{n}) (a + b x^{n})^{p} (c + d x^{n})^{q} ==
- The resulting integrands are of the same form as the original integrand, so these reduction formulas can be repeatedly applied to drive the exponents m, p and q toward 0.
- These reduction formulas can be used for integrands having integer and/or fractional exponents.
- Special cases of these reductions formulas can be used for integrands of the form $\left(a+b\,x^n\right)^p\left(c+d\,x^n\right)^q$ and $x^m\left(a+b\,x^n\right)^p\left(c+d\,x^n\right)^q$ by setting m and/or B to 0.
- $$\begin{align}
&\int x^m\left(A+B\,x^n\right)\left(a+b\,x^n\right)^p\left(c+d\,x^n\right)^qdx=
-\frac{(A\,b-a\,B) x^{m+1} \left(a+b\,x^n\right)^{p+1} \left(c+d\,x^n\right)^q}{a\,b\,n (p+1)}\,+\,
\frac{1}{a\,b\,n (p+1)}\,\cdot \\
&\qquad \int x^m\left(c (A\,b\,n (p+1)+(A\,b-a\,B) (m+1))+d (A\,b\,n (p+1)+(A\,b-a\,B) (m+n\,q+1)) x^n\right)\left(a+b\,x^n\right)^{p+1}\left(c+d\,x^n\right)^{q-1}dx
\end{align}$$
- $$\begin{align}
&\int x^m\left(A+B\,x^n\right)\left(a+b\,x^n\right)^p\left(c+d\,x^n\right)^qdx=
\frac{B\,x^{m+1} \left(a+b\,x^n\right)^{p+1} \left(c+d\,x^n\right)^q}{b (m+n (p+q+1)+1)}\,+\,
\frac{1}{b (m+n (p+q+1)+1)}\,\cdot \\
&\qquad \int x^m\left(c ((A\,b-a\,B) (1+m)+A\,b\,n (1+p+q))+(d(A\,b-a\,B) (1+m)+B\,n\,q(b\,c-a\,d)+A\,b\,d\,n (1+p+q))\,x^n\right)\left(a+b\,x^n\right)^p\left(c+d\,x^n\right)^{q-1}dx
\end{align}$$
- $$\begin{align}
&\int x^m\left(A+B\,x^n\right)\left(a+b\,x^n\right)^p\left(c+d\,x^n\right)^qdx=
-\frac{(A\,b-a\,B) x^{m+1} \left(a+b\,x^n\right)^{p+1} \left(c+d\,x^n\right)^{q+1}}{a\,n (b\,c-a\,d) (p+1)}\,+\,
\frac{1}{a\,n(b\,c-a\,d)(p+1)}\,\cdot \\
&\qquad \int x^m\left(c(A\,b-a\,B)(m+1)+A\,n (b\,c-a\,d)(p+1)+d(A\,b-a\,B) (m+n (p+q+2)+1) x^n\right)\left(a+b\,x^n\right)^{p+1}\left(c+d\,x^n\right)^qdx
\end{align}$$
- $$\begin{align}
&\int x^m\left(A+B\,x^n\right)\left(a+b\,x^n\right)^p\left(c+d\,x^n\right)^qdx=
\frac{B\,x^{m-n+1} \left(a+b\,x^n\right)^{p+1} \left(c+d\,x^n\right)^{q+1}}{b\,d (m+n (p+q+1)+1)}\,-\,
\frac{1}{b\,d (m+n (p+q+1)+1)}\,\cdot \\
&\qquad \int x^{m-n}\left(a\,B\,c (m-n+1)+(a\,B\,d (m+n\,q+1)-b (-B\,c (m+n\,p+1)+A\,d (m+n (p+q+1)+1))) x^n\right)\left(a+b\,x^n\right)^p\left(c+d\,x^n\right)^qdx
\end{align}$$
- $$\begin{align}
&\int x^m\left(A+B\,x^n\right)\left(a+b\,x^n\right)^p\left(c+d\,x^n\right)^qdx=
\frac{A\,x^{m+1} \left(a+b\,x^n\right)^{p+1} \left(c+d\,x^n\right)^{q+1}}{a\,c (m+1)}\,+\,
\frac{1}{a\,c (m+1)}\,\cdot \\
&\qquad \int x^{m+n}\left(a\,B\,c (m+1)-A (b\,c+a\,d) (m+n+1)-A\,n (b\,c\,p+a\,d\,q)-A\,b\,d (m+n (p+q+2)+1) x^n\right)\left(a+b\,x^n\right)^p\left(c+d\,x^n\right)^qdx
\end{align}$$
- $$\begin{align}
&\int x^m\left(A+B\,x^n\right)\left(a+b\,x^n\right)^p\left(c+d\,x^n\right)^qdx=
\frac{A\,x^{m+1} \left(a+b\,x^n\right)^{p+1} \left(c+d\,x^n\right)^q}{a (m+1)}\,-\,
\frac{1}{a (m+1)}\,\cdot \\
&\qquad \int x^{m+n}\left(c(A\,b-a\,B)(m+1)+A\,n (b\,c (p+1)+a\,d\,q)+d ((A\,b-a\,B) (m+1)+A\,b\,n (p+q+1)) x^n\right)\left(a+b\,x^n\right)^p\left(c+d\,x^n\right)^{q-1}dx
\end{align}$$
- $$\begin{align}
&\int x^m\left(A+B\,x^n\right)\left(a+b\,x^n\right)^p\left(c+d\,x^n\right)^qdx=
\frac{(A\,b-a\,B) x^{m-n+1} \left(a+b\,x^n\right)^{p+1} \left(c+d\,x^n\right)^{q+1}}{b\,n (b\,c-a\,d) (p+1)}\,-\,
\frac{1}{b\,n(b\,c-a\,d)(p+1)}\,\cdot \\
&\qquad \int x^{m-n}\left(c(A\,b-a\,B)(m-n+1)+(d(A\,b-a\,B)(m+n\,q+1)-b\,n(B\,c-A\,d)(p+1)) x^n\right)\left(a+b\,x^n\right)^{p+1}\left(c+d\,x^n\right)^qdx
\end{align}$$

== Integrands of the form (d + e x)^{m} (a + b x + c x^{2})^{p} when b^{2} − 4 a c = 0 ==
- The resulting integrands are of the same form as the original integrand, so these reduction formulas can be repeatedly applied to drive the exponents m and p toward 0.
- These reduction formulas can be used for integrands having integer and/or fractional exponents.
- Special cases of these reductions formulas can be used for integrands of the form $\left(a+b\,x+c\,x^2\right)^p$ when $b^2-4\,a\,c=0$ by setting m to 0.
- $\int (d+e\,x)^m \left(a+b\,x+c\,x^2\right)^pdx= \frac{(d+e\,x)^{m+1} \left(a+b\,x+c\,x^2\right)^p}{e(m+1)}\,-\, \frac{p (d+e\,x)^{m+2}(b+2 c\,x) \left(a+b\,x+c\,x^2\right)^{p-1}}{e^2(m+1)(m+2 p+1)}\,+\, \frac{p(2 p-1)(2 c\,d-b\,e)}{e^2(m+1)(m+2 p+1)} \int (d+e\,x)^{m+1}\left(a+b\,x+c\,x^2\right)^{p-1}dx$
- $\int (d+e\,x)^m \left(a+b\,x+c\,x^2\right)^pdx= \frac{(d+e\,x)^{m+1} \left(a+b\,x+c\,x^2\right)^p}{e(m+1)}\,-\, \frac{p (d+e\,x)^{m+2}(b+2\,c\,x)\left(a+b\,x+c\,x^2\right)^{p-1}}{e^2(m+1)(m+2)}\,+\, \frac{2\,c\,p\,(2\,p-1)}{e^2(m+1)(m+2)} \int (d+e\,x)^{m+2} \left(a+b\,x+c\,x^2\right)^{p-1}dx$
- $\int (d+e\,x)^m\left(a+b\,x+c\,x^2\right)^pdx= -\frac{e(m+2 p+2)(d+e\,x)^m \left(a+b\,x+c\,x^2\right)^{p+1}}{(p+1)(2p+1)(2 c\,d-b\,e)}\,+\, \frac{(d+e\,x)^{m+1}(b+2 c\,x) \left(a+b\,x+c\,x^2\right)^p}{(2p+1)(2 c\,d-b\,e)}\,+\, \frac{e^2m(m+2 p+2)}{(p+1)(2p+1)(2 c\,d-b\,e)} \int (d+e\,x)^{m-1} \left(a+b\,x+c\,x^2\right)^{p+1}dx$
- $\int (d+e\,x)^m \left(a+b\,x+c\,x^2\right)^pdx= -\frac{e\,m(d+e\,x)^{m-1} \left(a+b\,x+c\,x^2\right)^{p+1}}{2c (p+1) (2p+1)}\,+\, \frac{(d+e\,x)^m(b+2 c\,x)\left(a+b\,x+c\,x^2\right)^p}{2c (2p+1)}\,+\, \frac{e^2m(m-1)}{2c (p+1) (2p+1)} \int (d+e\,x)^{m-2} \left(a+b\,x+c\,x^2\right)^{p+1}dx$
- $\int (d+e\,x)^m \left(a+b\,x+c\,x^2\right)^pdx= \frac{(d+e\,x)^{m+1} \left(a+b\,x+c\,x^2\right)^p}{e(m+2p+1)}\,-\, \frac{p(2 c\,d-b\,e)(d+e\,x)^{m+1}(b+2 c\,x)\left(a+b\,x+c\,x^2\right)^{p-1}}{2c\,e^2(m+2 p)(m+2p+1)}\,+\, \frac{p (2 p-1)(2 c\,d-b\,e)^2}{2c\,e^2(m+2 p)(m+2p+1)} \int (d+e\,x)^m \left(a+b\,x+c\,x^2\right)^{p-1}dx$
- $\int (d+e\,x)^m \left(a+b\,x+c\,x^2\right)^pdx= -\frac{2c\,e(m+2p+2)(d+e\,x)^{m+1} \left(a+b\,x+c\,x^2\right)^{p+1}}{(p+1) (2 p+1)(2 c\,d-b\,e)^2}\,+\, \frac{(d+e\,x)^{m+1}(b+2 c\,x)\left(a+b\,x+c\,x^2\right)^p}{(2 p+1)(2 c\,d-b\,e)}\,+\, \frac{2c\,e^2(m+2p+2)(m+2 p+3)}{(p+1) (2 p+1)(2 c\,d-b\,e)^2} \int (d+e\,x)^m \left(a+b\,x+c\,x^2\right)^{p+1}dx$
- $\int (d+e\,x)^m \left(a+b\,x+c\,x^2\right)^pdx= \frac{(d+e\,x)^m (b+2 c\,x)\left(a+b\,x+c\,x^2\right)^p}{2c (m+2p+1)}\,+\, \frac{m(2 c\,d-b\,e)}{2c (m+2p+1)} \int (d+e\,x)^{m-1}\left(a+b\,x+c\,x^2\right)^pdx$
- $\int (d+e\,x)^m\left(a+b\,x+c\,x^2\right)^pdx= -\frac{(d+e\,x)^{m+1} (b+2 c\,x)\left(a+b\,x+c\,x^2\right)^p}{(m+1)(2 c\,d-b\,e)}\,+\, \frac{2c (m+2p+2)}{(m+1)(2 c\,d-b\,e)} \int (d+e\,x)^{m+1} \left(a+b\,x+c\,x^2\right)^pdx$

== Integrands of the form (d + e x)^{m} (A + B x) (a + b x + c x^{2})^{p} ==
- The resulting integrands are of the same form as the original integrand, so these reduction formulas can be repeatedly applied to drive the exponents m and p toward 0.
- These reduction formulas can be used for integrands having integer and/or fractional exponents.
- Special cases of these reductions formulas can be used for integrands of the form $\left(a+b\,x+c\,x^2\right)^p$ and $(d+e\,x)^m \left(a+b\,x+c\,x^2\right)^p$ by setting m and/or B to 0.
- $$\begin{align}
&\int (d+e\,x)^m (A+B\,x) \left(a+b\,x+c\,x^2\right)^pdx=
\frac{(d+e\,x)^{m+1} (A\,e (m+2 p+2)-B\,d (2 p+1)+e\,B (m+1) x) \left(a+b\,x+c\,x^2\right)^p}{e^2(m+1) (m+2 p+2)}\,+\,
\frac{1}{e^2(m+1) (m+2 p+2)}p\,\cdot \\
&\qquad \int (d+e\,x)^{m+1} (B (b\,d+2 a\,e+2 a\,e\,m+2 b\,d\,p)-A\,b\,e (m+2 p+2)+(B (2 c\,d+b\,e+b\,e m+4 c\,d\,p)-2 A\,c\,e (m+2 p+2))x)\left(a+b\,x+c\,x^2\right)^{p-1}dx
\end{align}$$
- $$\begin{align}
&\int (d+e\,x)^m (A+B\,x) \left(a+b\,x+c\,x^2\right)^pdx=
\frac{(d+e\,x)^m (A\,b-2 a\,B-(b\,B-2 A\,c) x)\left(a+b\,x+c\,x^2\right)^{p+1}}{(p+1)\left(b^2-4 a\,c\right) }\,+\,
\frac{1}{(p+1)\left(b^2-4 a\,c\right) }\,\cdot \\
&\qquad \int (d+e\,x)^{m-1}(B (2 a\,e\,m+b\,d (2 p+3))-A (b\,e\,m+2 c\,d (2 p+3))+e(b\,B-2 A\,c) (m+2 p+3) x)\left(a+b\,x+c\,x^2\right)^{p+1}dx
\end{align}$$
- $$\begin{align}
&\int (d+e\,x)^m (A+B\,x) \left(a+b\,x+c\,x^2\right)^pdx=
\frac{(d+e\,x)^{m+1} (A\,c\,e (m+2 p+2)-B (c\,d+2 c\,d\,p-b\,e\,p)+B\,c\,e(m+2 p+1) x)\left(a+b\,x+c\,x^2\right)^p}{c\,e^2(m+2 p+1) (m+2 p+2)}\,-\,
\frac{p}{c\,e^2(m+2 p+1) (m+2 p+2)}\,\cdot \\
&\qquad \int (d+e\,x)^m (A\,c\,e (b\,d-2 a\,e) (m+2 p+2)+B (a\,e (b\,e-2 c\,d\,m+b\,e\,m)+b\,d (b\,e\,p-c\,d-2 c\,d\,p))+ \\
&\qquad \qquad \left(A\,c\,e (2 c\,d-b\,e) (m+2 p+2)-B \left(-b^2 e^2 (m+p+1)+2 c^2 d^2 (1+2 p)+c\,e (b\,d (m-2 p)+2 a\,e (m+2 p+1))\right)\right) x)\left(a+b\,x+c\,x^2\right)^{p-1}dx
\end{align}$$
- $$\begin{align}
&\int (d+e\,x)^m (A+B\,x) \left(a+b\,x+c\,x^2\right)^pdx=
\frac{(d+e\,x)^{m+1} \left(A \left(b\,c\,d-b^2 e+2 a\,c\,e\right)-a\,B (2 c\,d-b\,e)+c (A (2 c\,d-b\,e)-B (b\,d-2 a\,e)) x\right)\left(a+b\,x+c\,x^2\right)^{p+1}}{(p+1)\left(b^2-4 a\,c\right) \left(c\,d^2-b\,d\,e+a\,e^2\right)}\,+ \\
&\qquad \frac{1}{(p+1)\left(b^2-4 a\,c\right) \left(c\,d^2-b\,d\,e+a\,e^2\right)}\,\cdot \\
&\qquad \qquad \int (d+e\,x)^m (A \left(b\,c\,d\,e (2 p-m+2)+b^2 e^2 (m+p+2)-2 c^2 d^2 (3+2 p)-2 a\,c\,e^2 (m+2 p+3)\right)- \\
&\qquad \qquad \qquad B (a\,e (b\,e-2 c\,d m+b\,e\,m)+b\,d (-3 c\,d+b\,e-2 c\,d\,p+b\,e\,p))+c\,e(B (b\,d-2 a\,e)-A (2 c\,d-b\,e)) (m+2 p+4) x)\left(a+b\,x+c\,x^2\right)^{p+1}dx
\end{align}$$
- $$\begin{align}
&\int (d+e\,x)^m (A+B\,x) \left(a+b\,x+c\,x^2\right)^pdx=
\frac{B(d+e\,x)^m\left(a+b\,x+c\,x^2\right)^{p+1}}{c(m+2 p+2)}\,+\,
\frac{1}{c(m+2 p+2)}\,\cdot \\
&\qquad \int (d+e\,x)^{m-1} (m(A\,c\,d-a\,B\,e)-d(b\,B-2 A\,c)(p+1) +((B\,c\,d-b\,B\,e+A\,c\,e) m-e(b\,B-2 A\,c)(p+1))x) \left(a+b\,x+c\,x^2\right)^pdx
\end{align}$$
- $$\begin{align}
&\int (d+e\,x)^m (A+B\,x) \left(a+b\,x+c\,x^2\right)^pdx=
-\frac{(B\,d-A\,e) (d+e\,x)^{m+1} \left(a+b\,x+c\,x^2\right)^{p+1}}{(m+1)\left(c\,d^2-b\,d\,e+a\,e^2\right)}\,+\,
\frac{1}{(m+1)\left(c\,d^2-b\,d\,e+a\,e^2\right)}\,\cdot \\
&\qquad \int (d+e\,x)^{m+1} ((A\,c\,d-A\,b\,e+a\,B\,e) (m+1)+b (B\,d-A\,e) (p+1)+c (B\,d-A\,e) (m+2 p+3) x)\left(a+b\,x+c\,x^2\right)^pdx
\end{align}$$

== Integrands of the form x^{m} (a + b x^{n} + c x^{2n})^{p} when b^{2} − 4 a c = 0 ==
- The resulting integrands are of the same form as the original integrand, so these reduction formulas can be repeatedly applied to drive the exponents m and p toward 0.
- These reduction formulas can be used for integrands having integer and/or fractional exponents.
- Special cases of these reductions formulas can be used for integrands of the form $\left(a+b\,x^n+c\,x^{2 n}\right)^p$ when $b^2-4\,a\,c=0$ by setting m to 0.
- $\int x^m \left(a+b\,x^n+c\,x^{2 n}\right)^p dx= \frac{ x^{m+1}\left(a+b\,x^n+c\,x^{2 n}\right)^p}{m+2 n\,p+1}\,+\, \frac{n\,p\,x^{m+1} \left(2 a+b\,x^n\right)\left(a+b\,x^n+c\,x^{2 n}\right)^{p-1}}{(m+1)(m+2 n\,p+1)}\,-\, \frac{b\,n^2 p (2 p-1)}{(m+1)(m+2 n\,p+1)} \int x^{m+n} \left(a+b\,x^n+c\,x^{2 n}\right)^{p-1}dx$
- $\int x^m \left(a+b\,x^n+c\,x^{2 n}\right)^p dx= \frac{(m+n(2 p-1)+1) x^{m+1}\left(a+b\,x^n+c\,x^{2 n}\right)^p}{(m+1)(m+n+1)}\,+\, \frac{n\,p\,x^{m+1} \left(2 a+b\,x^n\right)\left(a+b\,x^n+c\,x^{2 n}\right)^{p-1}}{(m+1)(m+n+1)}\,+\, \frac{2 c\,p\,n^2(2 p-1)}{(m+1)(m+n+1)} \int x^{m+2n} \left(a+b\,x^n+c\,x^{2 n}\right)^{p-1}dx$
- $\int x^m \left(a+b\,x^n+c\,x^{2 n}\right)^p dx= \frac{(m+n(2 p+1)+1) x^{m-n+1}\left(a+b\,x^n+c\,x^{2 n}\right)^{p+1}}{b\,n^2 (p+1) (2p+1)}\,-\, \frac{x^{m+1} \left(b+2 c\,x^n\right)\left(a+b\,x^n+c\,x^{2 n}\right)^p}{b\,n (2p+1)}\,-\, \frac{(m-n+1)(m+n(2 p+1)+1)}{b\,n^2 (p+1) (2p+1)} \int x^{m-n} \left(a+b\,x^n+c\,x^{2 n}\right)^{p+1}dx$
- $\int x^m \left(a+b\,x^n+c\,x^{2 n}\right)^p dx= -\frac{(m-3 n-2 n\,p+1) x^{m-2n+1}\left(a+b\,x^n+c\,x^{2 n}\right)^{p+1}}{2 c\,n^2(p+1)(2p+1)}\,-\, \frac{ x^{m-2n+1} \left(2 a+b\,x^n\right)\left(a+b\,x^n+c\,x^{2 n}\right)^p}{2 c\,n(2p+1)}\,+\, \frac{(m-n+1)(m-2n+1)}{2 c\,n^2(p+1)(2p+1)} \int x^{m-2n} \left(a+b\,x^n+c\,x^{2 n}\right)^{p+1}dx$
- $\int x^m \left(a+b\,x^n+c\,x^{2 n}\right)^p dx= \frac{x^{m+1}\left(a+b\,x^n+c\,x^{2 n}\right)^p}{m+2 n\,p+1}\,+\, \frac{n\,p\,x^{m+1} \left(2 a+b\,x^n\right)\left(a+b\,x^n+c\,x^{2 n}\right)^{p-1}}{(m+2 n\,p+1) (m+n(2 p-1)+1)}\,+\, \frac{2 a\,n^2 p (2 p-1)}{(m+2 n\,p+1) (m+n(2 p-1)+1)} \int x^m \left(a+b\,x^n+c\,x^{2 n}\right)^{p-1}dx$
- $\int x^m \left(a+b\,x^n+c\,x^{2 n}\right)^p dx= -\frac{(m+n+2 n\,p+1) x^{m+1}\left(a+b\,x^n+c\,x^{2 n}\right)^{p+1}}{2 a\,n^2 (p+1) (2p+1)}\,-\, \frac{x^{m+1} \left(2 a+b\,x^n\right)\left(a+b\,x^n+c\,x^{2 n}\right)^p}{2 a\,n(2p+1)}\,+\, \frac{(m+n(2 p+1)+1)(m+2 n (p+1)+1)}{2 a\,n^2 (p+1) (2p+1)} \int x^m \left(a+b\,x^n+c\,x^{2 n}\right)^{p+1}dx$
- $\int x^m\left(a+b\,x^n+c\,x^{2 n}\right)^p dx= \frac{x^{m-n+1} \left(b+2c\,x^n\right)\left(a+b\,x^n+c\,x^{2 n}\right)^p}{2c (m+2n\,p+1)}\,-\, \frac{b (m-n+1)}{2c (m+2n\,p+1)} \int x^{m-n} \left(a+b\,x^n+c\,x^{2 n}\right)^p dx$
- $\int x^m\left(a+b\,x^n+c\,x^{2 n}\right)^p dx= \frac{x^{m+1} \left(b+2c\,x^n\right)\left(a+b\,x^n+c\,x^{2 n}\right)^p}{b (m+1)}\,-\, \frac{2c (m+n(2 p+1)+1)}{b (m+1)} \int x^{m+n} \left(a+b\,x^n+c\,x^{2 n}\right)^p dx$

== Integrands of the form x^{m} (A + B x^{n}) (a + b x^{n} + c x^{2n})^{p} ==
- The resulting integrands are of the same form as the original integrand, so these reduction formulas can be repeatedly applied to drive the exponents m and p toward 0.
- These reduction formulas can be used for integrands having integer and/or fractional exponents.
- Special cases of these reductions formulas can be used for integrands of the form $\left(a+b\,x^n+c\,x^{2 n}\right)^p$ and $x^m \left(a+b\,x^n+c\,x^{2 n}\right)^p$ by setting m and/or B to 0.
- $$\begin{align}
&\int x^m \left(A+B\,x^n\right) \left(a+b\,x^n+c\,x^{2 n}\right)^pdx=
\frac{x^{m+1} \left(A (m+n (2 p+1)+1)+B (m+1) x^n\right) \left(a+b\,x^n+c\,x^{2 n}\right)^p}{(m+1) (m+n (2 p+1)+1)}\,+\,
\frac{n\,p}{(m+1) (m+n (2 p+1)+1)}\,\cdot \\
&\qquad \int x^{m+n} \left(2 a\,B (m+1)-A\,b (m+n (2 p+1)+1)+(b\,B (m+1)-2\,A\,c (m+n (2 p+1)+1)) x^n\right)\left(a+b\,x^n+c\,x^{2 n}\right)^{p-1}dx
\end{align}$$
- $$\begin{align}
&\int x^m \left(A+B\,x^n\right) \left(a+b\,x^n+c\,x^{2 n}\right)^pdx=
\frac{x^{m-n+1} \left(A\,b-2 a\,B-(b\,B-2 A\,c) x^n\right)\left(a+b\,x^n+c\,x^{2 n}\right)^{p+1}}{n(p+1) \left(b^2-4 a\,c\right)}\,+\,
\frac{1}{n(p+1) \left(b^2-4 a\,c\right)}\,\cdot \\
&\qquad \int x^{m-n}\left((m-n+1)(2 a\,B-A\,b)+(m+2n (p+1)+1) (b\,B-2 A\,c) x^n\right)\left(a+b\,x^n+c\,x^{2 n}\right)^{p+1}dx
\end{align}$$
- $$\begin{align}
&\int x^m \left(A+B\,x^n\right) \left(a+b\,x^n+c\,x^{2 n}\right)^pdx=
\frac{x^{m+1} \left(b\,B\,n\,p+A\,c (m+n (2 p+1)+1)+B\,c (m+2 n\,p+1) x^n\right)\left(a+b\,x^n+c\,x^{2 n}\right)^p}{c (m+2 n\,p+1) (m+n (2 p+1)+1)}\,+\,
\frac{n\,p}{c (m+2 n\,p+1) (m+n (2 p+1)+1)}\,\cdot \\
&\qquad \int x^m \left(2 a\,A\,c (m+n (2 p+1)+1)-a\,b\,B (m+1)+\left(2 a\,B\,c (m+2 n\,p+1)+A\,b\,c (m+n (2 p+1)+1)-b^2 B (m+n\,p+1)\right) x^n\right)\left(a+b\,x^n+c\,x^{2 n}\right)^{p-1}dx
\end{align}$$
- $$\begin{align}
&\int x^m \left(A+B\,x^n\right) \left(a+b\,x^n+c\,x^{2 n}\right)^pdx=
-\frac{x^{m+1} \left(A\,b^2-a\,b\,B-2 a\,A\,c+(A\,b-2 a\,B) c\,x^n\right)\left(a+b\,x^n+c\,x^{2 n}\right)^{p+1}}{a\,n(p+1) \left(b^2-4 a\,c\right)}\,+\,
\frac{1}{a\,n(p+1) \left(b^2-4 a\,c\right)}\,\cdot \\
&\qquad \int x^m \left((m+n (p+1)+1) A\,b^2-a\,b\,B(m+1)-2(m+2n (p+1)+1)a\,A\,c+(m+n (2p+3)+1)(A\,b-2 a\,B) c\,x^n\right)\left(a+b\,x^n+c\,x^{2 n}\right)^{p+1}dx
\end{align}$$
- $$\begin{align}
&\int x^m \left(A+B\,x^n\right) \left(a+b\,x^n+c\,x^{2 n}\right)^pdx=
\frac{B\,x^{m-n+1}\left(a+b\,x^n+c\,x^{2 n}\right)^{p+1}}{c (m+n (2 p+1)+1)}\,-\,
\frac{1}{c (m+n (2 p+1)+1)}\,\cdot \\
&\qquad \int x^{m-n} \left(a\,B (m-n+1)+(b\,B (m+n\,p+1)-A\,c (m+n (2 p+1)+1)) x^n\right) \left(a+b\,x^n+c\,x^{2 n}\right)^pdx
\end{align}$$
- $$\begin{align}
&\int x^m \left(A+B\,x^n\right) \left(a+b\,x^n+c\,x^{2 n}\right)^pdx=
\frac{A\,x^{m+1} \left(a+b\,x^n+c\,x^{2 n}\right)^{p+1}}{a(m+1)}\,+\,
\frac{1}{a(m+1)}\,\cdot \\
&\qquad \int x^{m+n} \left(a\,B (m+1)-A\,b (m+n (p+1)+1)-A\,c (m+2 n(p+1)+1) x^n\right)\left(a+b\,x^n+c\,x^{2 n}\right)^pdx
\end{align}$$
