= Baire one star function =

Function studied in real analysis

In mathematics, a function $f: \R \to \R$ is a Baire one star function, written $f \in \mathbf{B}^{*}_{1}$, if, for each perfect set $P \in \R$, there is an open interval $I \in \R$ such that $P \cap I$ is nonempty and the restriction $f\,\mid_{P \cap I}$ is continuous. The concept itself (under a different name) goes back at least to 1951, where it is labelled as [CG] (for generalized continuity).
