= List of integrals of hyperbolic functions =

The following is a list of integrals (anti-derivative functions) of hyperbolic functions. For a complete list of integral functions, see list of integrals.

In all formulas the constant a is assumed to be nonzero, and C denotes the constant of integration.

== Integrals involving only hyperbolic sine functions ==
- $\int\sinh ax\,dx = \frac{1}{a}\cosh ax+C$
- $\int\sinh^2 ax\,dx = \frac{1}{4a}\sinh 2ax - \frac{x}{2}+C$
- $$\int\sinh^n ax\,dx = \begin{cases}
\frac{1}{an}(\sinh^{n-1} ax)(\cosh ax) - \frac{n-1}{n}\displaystyle\int\sinh^{n-2} ax\,dx, & n>0 \\
\frac{1}{a(n+1)}(\sinh^{n+1} ax)(\cosh ax) - \frac{n+2}{n+1}\displaystyle\int\sinh^{n+2}ax\,dx, & n<0, n\neq -1
\end{cases}$$
- $$\begin{align}
\int\frac{dx}{\sinh ax} &= \frac{1}{a} \ln\left|\tanh\frac{ax}{2}\right|+C \\
&= \frac{1}{a} \ln\left|\frac{\cosh ax - 1}{\sinh ax}\right|+C \\
&= \frac{1}{a} \ln\left|\frac{\sinh ax}{\cosh ax + 1}\right|+C \\
&= \frac{1}{2a} \ln\left|\frac{\cosh ax - 1}{\cosh ax + 1}\right|+C
\end{align}$$
- $\int\frac{dx}{\sinh^n ax} = -\frac{\cosh ax}{a(n-1)\sinh^{n-1} ax}-\frac{n-2}{n-1}\int\frac{dx}{\sinh^{n-2} ax} \qquad\mbox{(for }n\neq 1\mbox{)}$
- $\int x\sinh ax\,dx = \frac{1}{a} x\cosh ax - \frac{1}{a^2}\sinh ax+C$
- $\int (\sinh ax)(\sinh bx)\,dx = \frac{1}{a^2-b^2} \big(a(\sinh bx)(\cosh ax) - b(\cosh bx)(\sinh ax)\big)+C \qquad\mbox{(for }a^2\neq b^2\mbox{)}$

== Integrals involving only hyperbolic cosine functions ==
- $\int\cosh ax\,dx = \frac{1}{a}\sinh ax+C$
- $\int\cosh^2 ax\,dx = \frac{1}{4a}\sinh 2ax + \frac{x}{2}+C$
- $$\int\cosh^n ax\,dx = \begin{cases}
\frac{1}{an}(\sinh ax)(\cosh^{n-1} ax) + \frac{n-1}{n}\displaystyle\int\cosh^{n-2} ax\,dx, & n>0 \\
-\frac{1}{a(n+1)}(\sinh ax)(\cosh^{n+1} ax) + \frac{n+2}{n+1}\displaystyle\int\cosh^{n+2}ax\,dx, & n<0, n\neq -1
\end{cases}$$
- $$\begin{align}
\int\frac{dx}{\cosh ax} &= \frac{2}{a} \arctan e^{ax}+C \\
&= \frac{1}{a} \arctan (\sinh ax)+C
\end{align}$$
- $\int\frac{dx}{\cosh^n ax} = \frac{\sinh ax}{a(n-1)\cosh^{n-1} ax}+\frac{n-2}{n-1}\int\frac{dx}{\cosh^{n-2} ax} \qquad\mbox{(for }n\neq 1\mbox{)}$
- $\int x\cosh ax\,dx = \frac{1}{a} x\sinh ax - \frac{1}{a^2}\cosh ax+C$
- $\int x^2 \cosh ax\,dx = -\frac{2x \cosh ax}{a^2} + \left(\frac{x^2}{a}+\frac{2}{a^3}\right) \sinh ax+C$
- $\int (\cosh ax)(\cosh bx)\,dx = \frac{1}{a^2-b^2} \big(a(\sinh ax)(\cosh bx) - b(\sinh bx)(\cosh ax)\big)+C \qquad\mbox{(for }a^2\neq b^2\mbox{)}$
- $\int \frac{dx}{1+\cosh(ax)} = \frac{2}{a} \frac{1}{1+e^{-ax}}+C\quad$ or $\frac{2}{a}$ times The Logistic Function

== Other integrals ==
=== Integrals of hyperbolic tangent, cotangent, secant, cosecant functions ===
- $\int \tanh x \, dx = \ln \cosh x + C$
- $\int\tanh^2 ax\,dx = x - \frac{\tanh ax}{a}+C$
- $\int \tanh^n ax\,dx = -\frac{1}{a(n-1)}\tanh^{n-1} ax+\int\tanh^{n-2} ax\,dx \qquad\mbox{(for }n\neq 1\mbox{)}$
- $\int \coth x \, dx = \ln| \sinh x | + C , \text{ for } x \neq 0$
- $\int \coth^n ax\,dx = -\frac{1}{a(n-1)}\coth^{n-1} ax+\int\coth^{n-2} ax\,dx \qquad\mbox{(for }n\neq 1\mbox{)}$
- $\int \operatorname{sech}\,x \, dx = \arctan\,(\sinh x) + C$
- $\int \operatorname{csch}\,x \, dx = \ln\left| \tanh {x \over2}\right| + C = \ln\left|\coth{x}-\operatorname{csch}{x}\right|+C, \text{ for } x \neq 0$

=== Integrals involving hyperbolic sine and cosine functions ===
- $\int (\cosh ax)(\sinh bx)\,dx = \frac{1}{a^2-b^2} \big(a(\sinh ax)(\sinh bx) - b(\cosh ax)(\cosh bx)\big)+C \qquad\mbox{(for }a^2\neq b^2\mbox{)}$
- $$\begin{align}
\int\frac{\cosh^n ax}{\sinh^m ax}\,dx &= \frac{\cosh^{n-1} ax}{a(n-m)\sinh^{m-1} ax} + \frac{n-1}{n-m}\int\frac{\cosh^{n-2} ax}{\sinh^m ax}\,dx \qquad\mbox{(for }m\neq n\mbox{)} \\
&= -\frac{\cosh^{n+1} ax}{a(m-1)\sinh^{m-1} ax} + \frac{n-m+2}{m-1}\int\frac{\cosh^n ax}{\sinh^{m-2} ax}\,dx \qquad\mbox{(for }m\neq 1\mbox{)} \\
&= -\frac{\cosh^{n-1} ax}{a(m-1)\sinh^{m-1} ax} + \frac{n-1}{m-1}\int\frac{\cosh^{n-2} ax}{\sinh^{m-2} ax}\,dx \qquad\mbox{(for }m\neq 1\mbox{)}
\end{align}$$
- $$\begin{align}
\int\frac{\sinh^m ax}{\cosh^n ax}\,dx &= \frac{\sinh^{m-1} ax}{a(m-n)\cosh^{n-1} ax} + \frac{m-1}{n-m}\int\frac{\sinh^{m-2} ax}{\cosh^n ax}\,dx \qquad\mbox{(for }m\neq n\mbox{)} \\
&= \frac{\sinh^{m+1} ax}{a(n-1)\cosh^{n-1} ax} + \frac{m-n+2}{n-1}\int\frac{\sinh^m ax}{\cosh^{n-2} ax}\,dx \qquad\mbox{(for }n\neq 1\mbox{)} \\
&= -\frac{\sinh^{m-1} ax}{a(n-1)\cosh^{n-1} ax} + \frac{m-1}{n-1}\int\frac{\sinh^{m -2} ax}{\cosh^{n-2} ax}\,dx \qquad\mbox{(for }n\neq 1\mbox{)}
\end{align}$$

=== Integrals involving hyperbolic and trigonometric functions ===
- $\int \sinh (ax+b)\sin (cx+d)\,dx = \frac{a}{a^2+c^2}\cosh(ax+b)\sin(cx+d)-\frac{c}{a^2+c^2}\sinh(ax+b)\cos(cx+d)+C$
- $\int \sinh (ax+b)\cos (cx+d)\,dx = \frac{a}{a^2+c^2}\cosh(ax+b)\cos(cx+d)+\frac{c}{a^2+c^2}\sinh(ax+b)\sin(cx+d)+C$
- $\int \cosh (ax+b)\sin (cx+d)\,dx = \frac{a}{a^2+c^2}\sinh(ax+b)\sin(cx+d)-\frac{c}{a^2+c^2}\cosh(ax+b)\cos(cx+d)+C$
- $\int \cosh (ax+b)\cos (cx+d)\,dx = \frac{a}{a^2+c^2}\sinh(ax+b)\cos(cx+d)+\frac{c}{a^2+c^2}\cosh(ax+b)\sin(cx+d)+C$
