= List of integrals of irrational algebraic functions =

The following is a list of integrals (antiderivative functions) of irrational functions. For a complete list of integral functions, see lists of integrals. Throughout this article the integration variable and all parameters are assumed to be real numbers and the constant of integration is omitted for brevity.

== Integrals involving r = √a^{2} + x^{2} ==
- $\int r\,dx = \frac{1}{2}\left(x r +a^2\,\ln\left(x+r\right)\right)$
- $\int r^3\,dx = \frac{1}{4}xr^3+\frac{3}{8}a^2xr+\frac{3}{8}a^4\ln\left(x+r\right)$
- $\int r^5\,dx = \frac{1}{6}xr^5+\frac{5}{24}a^2xr^3+\frac{5}{16}a^4xr+\frac{5}{16}a^6\ln\left(x+r\right)$
- $\int x r\,dx = \frac{r^3}{3}$
- $\int x r^3\,dx = \frac{r^5}{5}$
- $\int x r^{2n+1}\,dx = \frac{r^{2n+3}}{2n+3}$
- $\int x^2 r\,dx = \frac{xr^3}{4}-\frac{a^2xr}{8}-\frac{a^4}{8}\ln\left(x+r\right)$
- $\int x^2 r^3\,dx = \frac{xr^5}{6}-\frac{a^2xr^3}{24}-\frac{a^4xr}{16}-\frac{a^6}{16}\ln\left(x+r\right)$
- $\int x^3 r\,dx = \frac{r^5}{5} - \frac{a^2 r^3}{3}$
- $\int x^3 r^3\,dx = \frac{r^7}{7}-\frac{a^2r^5}{5}$
- $\int x^3 r^{2n+1}\,dx = \frac{r^{2n+5}}{2n+5} - \frac{a^2 r^{2n+3}}{2n+3}$
- $\int x^4 r\,dx = \frac{x^3r^3}{6}-\frac{a^2xr^3}{8}+\frac{a^4xr}{16}+\frac{a^6}{16}\ln\left(x+r\right)$
- $\int x^4 r^3\,dx = \frac{x^3r^5}{8}-\frac{a^2xr^5}{16}+\frac{a^4xr^3}{64}+\frac{3a^6xr}{128}+\frac{3a^8}{128}\ln\left(x+r\right)$
- $\int x^5 r\,dx = \frac{r^7}{7} - \frac{2 a^2 r^5}{5} + \frac{a^4 r^3}{3}$
- $\int x^5 r^3\,dx = \frac{r^9}{9} - \frac{2 a^2 r^7}{7} + \frac{a^4 r^5}{5}$
- $\int x^5 r^{2n+1}\,dx = \frac{r^{2n+7}}{2n+7} - \frac{2a^2r^{2n+5}}{2n+5}+\frac{a^4 r^{2n+3}}{2n+3}$
- $\int\frac{r\,dx}{x} = r-a\ln\left|\frac{a+r}{x}\right| = r - a\, \operatorname{arsinh}\frac{a}{x}$
- $\int\frac{r^3\,dx}{x} = \frac{r^3}{3}+a^2r-a^3\ln\left|\frac{a+r}{x}\right|$
- $\int\frac{r^5\,dx}{x} = \frac{r^5}{5}+\frac{a^2r^3}{3}+a^4r-a^5\ln\left|\frac{a+r}{x}\right|$
- $\int\frac{r^7\,dx}{x} = \frac{r^7}{7}+\frac{a^2r^5}{5}+\frac{a^4r^3}{3}+a^6r-a^7\ln\left|\frac{a+r}{x}\right|$
- $\int\frac{dx}{r} = \operatorname{arsinh}\frac{x}{a} = \ln\left( \frac{x+r}{a} \right)$
- $\int\frac{dx}{r^3} = \frac{x}{a^2r}$
- $\int\frac{x\,dx}{r} = r$
- $\int\frac{x\,dx}{r^3} = -\frac{1}{r}$
- $\int\frac{x^2\,dx}{r} = \frac{x}{2}r-\frac{a^2}{2}\,\operatorname{arsinh}\frac{x}{a} = \frac{x}{2}r-\frac{a^2}{2}\ln\left( \frac {x+r}{a} \right)$
- $\int\frac{dx}{xr} = -\frac{1}{a}\,\operatorname{arsinh}\frac{a}{x} = -\frac{1}{a}\ln\left|\frac{a+r}{x}\right|$

== Integrals involving s = √x^{2} − a^{2} ==
Assume x^{2} > a^{2} (for x^{2} < a^{2}, see next section):

- $\int s\,dx = \frac{1}{2}\left(xs-a^{2}\ln\left|x+s\right|\right)$
- $\int xs\,dx = \frac{1}{3}s^3$
- $\int\frac{s\,dx}{x} = s - |a|\arccos\left|\frac{a}{x}\right|$
- $\int\frac{dx}{s} = \ln\left|\frac{x+s}{a}\right| =\operatorname{sgn}(x)\,\operatorname{arcosh}\left|\frac{x}{a}\right| =\frac{1}{2}\ln\left(\frac{x+s}{x-s}\right)\,,$ where the positive value of $\operatorname{arcosh}\left|\frac{x}{a}\right|$ is to be taken.
- $\int\frac{dx}{xs} = \frac{1}{a}\operatorname{arcsec}\left|\frac{x}{a}\right|$
- $\int\frac{x\,dx}{s} = s$
- $\int\frac{x\,dx}{s^3} = -\frac{1}{s}$
- $\int\frac{x\,dx}{s^5} = -\frac{1}{3s^3}$
- $\int\frac{x\,dx}{s^7} = -\frac{1}{5s^5}$
- $\int\frac{x\,dx}{s^{2n+1}} = -\frac{1}{(2n-1)s^{2n-1}}$
- $\int\frac{x^{2m}\,dx}{s^{2n+1}} = -\frac{1}{2n-1}\frac{x^{2m-1}}{s^{2n-1}}+\frac{2m-1}{2n-1}\int\frac{x^{2m-2}\,dx}{s^{2n-1}}$
- $\int\frac{x^2\,dx}{s} = \frac{xs}{2}+\frac{a^2}{2}\ln\left|\frac{x+s}{a}\right|$
- $\int\frac{x^2\,dx}{s^3} = -\frac{x}{s}+\ln\left|\frac{x+s}{a}\right|$
- $\int\frac{x^4\,dx}{s} = \frac{x^3s}{4}+\frac{3}{8}a^2xs+\frac{3}{8}a^4\ln\left|\frac{x+s}{a}\right|$
- $\int\frac{x^4\,dx}{s^3} = \frac{xs}{2}-\frac{a^2x}{s}+\frac{3}{2}a^2\ln\left|\frac{x+s}{a}\right|$
- $\int\frac{x^4\,dx}{s^5} = -\frac{x}{s}-\frac{1}{3}\frac{x^3}{s^3}+\ln\left|\frac{x+s}{a}\right|$
- $\int\frac{x^{2m}\,dx}{s^{2n+1}} = (-1)^{n-m}\frac{1}{a^{2(n-m)}}\sum_{i=0}^{n-m-1}\frac{1}{2(m+i)+1}{n-m-1 \choose i}\frac{x^{2(m+i)+1}}{s^{2(m+i)+1}}\qquad\mbox{(}n>m\ge0\mbox{)}$
- $\int\frac{dx}{s^3} = -\frac{1}{a^2}\frac{x}{s}$
- $\int\frac{dx}{s^5} = \frac{1}{a^4}\left[\frac{x}{s}-\frac{1}{3}\frac{x^3}{s^3}\right]$
- $\int\frac{dx}{s^7} =-\frac{1}{a^6}\left[\frac{x}{s}-\frac{2}{3}\frac{x^3}{s^3}+\frac{1}{5}\frac{x^5}{s^5}\right]$
- $\int\frac{dx}{s^9} =\frac{1}{a^8}\left[\frac{x}{s}-\frac{3}{3}\frac{x^3}{s^3}+\frac{3}{5}\frac{x^5}{s^5}-\frac{1}{7}\frac{x^7}{s^7}\right]$
- $\int\frac{x^2\,dx}{s^5} = -\frac{1}{a^2}\frac{x^3}{3s^3}$
- $\int\frac{x^2\,dx}{s^7} = \frac{1}{a^4}\left[\frac{1}{3}\frac{x^3}{s^3}-\frac{1}{5}\frac{x^5}{s^5}\right]$
- $\int\frac{x^2\,dx}{s^9} = -\frac{1}{a^6}\left[\frac{1}{3}\frac{x^3}{s^3}-\frac{2}{5}\frac{x^5}{s^5}+\frac{1}{7}\frac{x^7}{s^7}\right]$

== Integrals involving u = √a^{2} − x^{2} ==
- $\int u\,dx = \frac{1}{2}\left(xu+a^2\arcsin\frac{x}{a}\right) \qquad\mbox{(}|x|\leq|a|\mbox{)}$
- $\int xu\,dx = -\frac{1}{3} u^3 \qquad\mbox{(}|x|\leq|a|\mbox{)}$
- $\int x^2u\,dx = -\frac{x}{4} u^3+\frac{a^2}{8}(xu+a^2\arcsin\frac{x}{a}) \qquad\mbox{(}|x|\leq|a|\mbox{)}$
- $\int\frac{u\,dx}{x} = u-a\ln\left|\frac{a+u}{x}\right| \qquad\mbox{(}|x|\leq|a|\mbox{)}$
- $\int\frac{dx}{u} = \arcsin\frac{x}{a} \qquad\mbox{(}|x|\leq|a|\mbox{)}$
- $\int\frac{x^2\,dx}{u} = \frac{1}{2}\left(-xu+a^2\arcsin\frac{x}{a}\right) \qquad\mbox{(}|x|\leq|a|\mbox{)}$
- $\int u\,dx = \frac{1}{2}\left(xu-\sgn x\,\operatorname{arcosh}\left|\frac{x}{a}\right|\right) \qquad\mbox{(for }|x|\ge|a|\mbox{)}$
- $\int \frac{x}{u}\,dx = -u \qquad\mbox{(}|x|\leq|a|\mbox{)}$

== Integrals involving R = √ax^{2} + bx + c ==
Assume (ax^{2} + bx + c) cannot be reduced to the following expression (px + q)^{2} for some p and q.

- $\int\frac{dx}{R} = \frac{1}{\sqrt{a}}\ln\left|2\sqrt{a}R+2ax+b\right| \qquad \mbox{(for }a>0\mbox{)}$
- $\int\frac{dx}{R} = \frac{1}{\sqrt{a}}\,\operatorname{arsinh}\frac{2ax+b}{\sqrt{4ac-b^2}} \qquad \mbox{(for }a>0\mbox{, }4ac-b^2>0\mbox{)}$
- $\int\frac{dx}{R} = \frac{1}{\sqrt{a}}\ln|2ax+b| \quad \mbox{(for }a>0\mbox{, }4ac-b^2=0\mbox{)}$
- $\int\frac{dx}{R} = -\frac{1}{\sqrt{-a}}\arcsin\frac{2ax+b}{\sqrt{b^2-4ac}} \qquad \mbox{(for }a<0\mbox{, }4ac-b^2<0\mbox{, }\left|2ax+b\right|<\sqrt{b^2-4ac}\mbox{)}$
- $\int\frac{dx}{R^3} = \frac{4ax+2b}{(4ac-b^2)R}$
- $\int\frac{dx}{R^5} = \frac{4ax+2b}{3(4ac-b^2)R}\left(\frac{1}{R^2}+\frac{8a}{4ac-b^2}\right)$
- $\int\frac{dx}{R^{2n+1}} = \frac{2}{(2n-1)(4ac-b^2)}\left(\frac{2ax+b}{R^{2n-1}}+4a(n-1)\int\frac{dx}{R^{2n-1}}\right)$
- $\int\frac{x}{R}\,dx = \frac{R}{a}-\frac{b}{2a}\int\frac{dx}{R}$
- $\int\frac{x}{R^3}\,dx = -\frac{2bx+4c}{(4ac-b^2)R}$
- $\int\frac{x}{R^{2n+1}}\,dx = -\frac{1}{(2n-1)aR^{2n-1}}-\frac{b}{2a}\int\frac{dx}{R^{2n+1}}$
- $\int\frac{dx}{xR} = -\frac{1}{\sqrt{c}}\ln \left|\frac{2\sqrt{c}R+bx+2c}{x}\right|, ~ c > 0$
- $\int\frac{dx}{xR} = -\frac{1}{\sqrt{c}}\operatorname{arsinh}\left(\frac{bx+2c}{|x|\sqrt{4ac-b^2}}\right), ~ c < 0$
- $\int\frac{dx}{xR} = \frac{1}{\sqrt{-c}}\operatorname{arcsin}\left(\frac{bx+2c}{|x|\sqrt{b^2-4ac}}\right), ~ c < 0, b^2-4ac>0$
- $\int\frac{dx}{xR} = -\frac{2}{bx}\left(\sqrt{ax^2+bx}\right), ~ c = 0$
- $\int\frac{x^2}{R}\,dx = \frac{2ax-3b}{4a^2}R+\frac{3b^2-4ac}{8a^2}\int\frac{dx}{R}$
- $\int \frac{dx}{x^{2} R} = -\frac{ R}{cx}-\frac{b}{2c} \int \frac{dx}{x R}$
- $\int R\,dx = \frac{2ax+b}{4a} R + \frac{4ac-b^{2}}{8a} \int \frac{dx}{ R}$
- $\int x R\,dx = \frac{R^3}{3a}-\frac{b(2ax+b)}{8a^{2}} R - \frac{b(4ac-b^{2})}{16a^{2}} \int \frac{dx}{ R}$
- $\int x^{2} R\,dx = \frac{6ax-5b}{24a^{2}}R^3+\frac{5b^{2}-4ac}{16a^{2}} \int R\,dx$
- $\int \frac{ R}{x}\,dx = R + \frac{b}{2} \int \frac{dx}{ R}+c \int \frac{dx}{x R}$
- $\int \frac{ R}{x^{2}}\,dx = -\frac{ R}{x}+a \int \frac{dx}{R}+ \frac{b}{2} \int \frac{dx}{ xR}$
- $\int \frac{x^{2}\,dx}{R^3} = \frac{(2b^{2}-4ac)x+2bc}{a(4ac-b^{2}) R}+ \frac{1}{a} \int \frac{dx}{ R}$

== Integrals involving S = √ax + b ==
- $\int S\,dx = \frac{2 S^{3}}{3 a}$
- $\int \frac{dx}{S} = \frac{2S}{a}$
- $$\int \frac{dx}{x S} =
\begin{cases}
-\dfrac{2}{\sqrt{b}} \operatorname{arcoth}\left( \dfrac{S}{\sqrt{b}}\right) & \mbox{(for }b > 0, \quad a x > 0\mbox{)} \\
-\dfrac{2}{\sqrt{b}} \operatorname{artanh}\left( \dfrac{S}{\sqrt{b}}\right) & \mbox{(for }b > 0, \quad a x < 0\mbox{)} \\
\dfrac{2}{\sqrt{-b}} \arctan\left( \dfrac{S}{\sqrt{-b}}\right)  & \mbox{(for }b < 0\mbox{)} \\
\end{cases}$$
- $$\int\frac{S}{x}\,dx =
\begin{cases}
2 \left( S - \sqrt{b}\,\operatorname{arcoth}\left( \dfrac{S}{\sqrt{b}}\right)\right) & \mbox{(for }b > 0, \quad a x > 0\mbox{)} \\
2 \left( S - \sqrt{b}\,\operatorname{artanh}\left( \dfrac{S}{\sqrt{b}}\right)\right) & \mbox{(for }b > 0, \quad a x < 0\mbox{)} \\
2 \left( S - \sqrt{-b} \arctan\left( \dfrac{S}{\sqrt{-b}}\right)\right) & \mbox{(for }b < 0\mbox{)} \\
\end{cases}$$
- $\int \frac{x^{n}}{S}\,dx = \frac{2}{a (2 n + 1)} \left( x^{n} S - b n \int \frac{x^{n - 1}}{S}\,dx\right)$
- $\int x^{n} S\,dx = \frac{2}{a (2 n + 3)} \left(x^{n} S^{3} - n b \int x^{n - 1} S\,dx\right)$
- $\int \frac{1}{x^{n} S}\,dx = -\frac{1}{b (n - 1)} \left( \frac{S}{x^{n - 1}} + \left( n - \frac{3}{2}\right) a \int \frac{dx}{x^{n - 1} S}\right)$
