= Lists of integrals =

Integration is the basic operation in integral calculus. While differentiation has straightforward rules by which the derivative of a complicated function can be found by differentiating its simpler component functions, integration does not, so tables of known integrals are often useful. This page lists some of the most common antiderivatives.

== Historical development of integrals ==
A compilation of a list of integrals (Integraltafeln) and techniques of integral calculus was published by the German mathematician Meier Hirsch (also spelled Meyer Hirsch) in 1810. These tables were republished in the United Kingdom in 1823. More extensive tables were compiled in 1858 by the Dutch mathematician David Bierens de Haan for his Tables d'intégrales définies, supplemented by Supplément aux tables d'intégrales définies in ca. 1864. A new edition was published in 1867 under the title Nouvelles tables d'intégrales définies.

These tables, which contain mainly integrals of elementary functions, remained in use until the middle of the 20th century. They were then replaced by the much more extensive tables of Gradshteyn and Ryzhik. In Gradshteyn and Ryzhik, integrals originating from the book by Bierens de Haan are denoted by BI.

Not all closed-form expressions have closed-form antiderivatives; this study forms the subject of differential Galois theory, which was initially developed by Joseph Liouville in the 1830s and 1840s, leading to Liouville's theorem which classifies which expressions have closed-form antiderivatives. A simple example of a function without a closed-form antiderivative is e^{−x^{2}}, whose antiderivative is (up to constants) the error function.

Since 1968 there is the Risch algorithm for determining indefinite integrals that can be expressed in term of elementary functions, typically using a computer algebra system. Integrals that cannot be expressed using elementary functions can be manipulated symbolically using general functions such as the Meijer G-function.

== Lists of integrals ==
More detail may be found on the following pages for the lists of integrals:

- List of integrals of rational functions
- List of integrals of irrational algebraic functions
- List of integrals of trigonometric functions
- List of integrals of inverse trigonometric functions
- List of integrals of hyperbolic functions
- List of integrals of inverse hyperbolic functions
- List of integrals of exponential functions
- List of integrals of logarithmic functions
- List of integrals of Gaussian functions

Gradshteyn, Ryzhik, Geronimus, Tseytlin, Jeffrey, Zwillinger, and Moll's (GR) Table of Integrals, Series, and Products contains a large collection of results. An even larger, multivolume table is the Integrals and Series by Prudnikov, Brychkov, and Marichev (with volumes 1–3 listing integrals and series of elementary and special functions, volume 4–5 are tables of Laplace transforms). More compact collections can be found in e.g. Brychkov, Marichev, Prudnikov's Tables of Indefinite Integrals, or as chapters in Zwillinger's CRC Standard Mathematical Tables and Formulae or Bronshtein and Semendyayev's Guide Book to Mathematics, Handbook of Mathematics or Users' Guide to Mathematics, and other mathematical handbooks.

Other useful resources include Abramowitz and Stegun and the Bateman Manuscript Project. Both works contain many identities concerning specific integrals, which are organized with the most relevant topic instead of being collected into a separate table. Two volumes of the Bateman Manuscript are specific to integral transforms.

There are several web sites which have tables of integrals and integrals on demand. Wolfram Alpha can show results, and for some simpler expressions, also the intermediate steps of the integration. Wolfram Research also operates another online service, the Mathematica Online Integrator.

== Integrals of simple functions ==
C is used for an arbitrary constant of integration that can only be determined if something about the value of the integral at some point is known. Thus, each function has an infinite number of antiderivatives.

These formulas only state in another form the assertions in the table of derivatives.

=== Integrals with a singularity ===
When there is a singularity in the function being integrated such that the antiderivative becomes undefined at some point (the singularity), then C does not need to be the same on both sides of the singularity. The forms below normally assume the Cauchy principal value around a singularity in the value of C, but this is not necessary in general. For instance, in
$$\int {1 \over x}\,dx = \ln \left|x \right| + C$$
there is a singularity at 0 and the antiderivative becomes infinite there. If the integral above were to be used to compute a definite integral between −1 and 1, one would get the wrong answer 0. This however is the Cauchy principal value of the integral around the singularity. If the integration is done in the complex plane the result depends on the path around the origin, in this case the singularity contributes −iπ when using a path above the origin and iπ for a path below the origin. A function on the real line could use a completely different value of C on either side of the origin as in:
$$\int {1 \over x}\,dx = \ln|x| + \begin{cases} A & \text{if }x>0; \\ B & \text{if }x < 0. \end{cases}$$

=== Rational functions ===
- $\int a\,dx = ax + C$

The following function has a non-integrable singularity at 0 for n ≤ −1:

- $\int x^n\,dx = \frac{x^{n+1}}{n+1} + C \qquad\text{(for } n\neq -1\text{)}$ (Cavalieri's quadrature formula)
- $\int (ax + b)^n \, dx= \frac{(ax + b)^{n+1}}{a(n + 1)} + C \qquad\text{(for } n\neq -1\text{)}$
- $\int {1 \over x}\,dx = \ln \left|x \right| + C$
  - More generally,
    $$\int {1 \over x}\,dx = \begin{cases}
\ln \left|x \right| + C^- & x < 0\\
\ln \left|x \right| + C^+ & x > 0
\end{cases}$$
- $\int\frac{c}{ax + b} \, dx= \frac{c}{a}\ln\left|ax + b\right| + C$

=== Exponential functions ===
- $\int e^{ax}\,dx = \frac{1}{a}e^{ax} + C$
- $\int f'(x)e^{f(x)}\,dx = e^{f(x)} + C$
- $\int a^x\,dx = \frac{a^x}{\ln a} + C$
- $\int{e^{x}\left( f\left( x \right) + f'\left( x \right) \right)\,dx} = e^{x}f\left( x \right) + C$
- $\int {e^{x}\left( f\left( x \right) - \left( - 1 \right)^{n}\frac{d^{n}f\left( x \right)}{dx^{n}} \right)\,dx} = e^{x}\sum_{k = 1}^{n}{\left( - 1 \right)^{k - 1}\frac{d^{k - 1}f\left( x \right)}{dx^{k - 1}}} + C$
  (if $n$ is a positive integer)
- $\int {e^{- x}\left( f\left( x \right) - \frac{d^{n}f\left( x \right)}{dx^{n}} \right)\, dx} = - e^{- x}\sum_{k = 1}^{n}\frac{d^{k - 1}f\left( x \right)}{dx^{k - 1}} + C$
  (if $n$ is a positive integer)

=== Logarithms ===
- $\int \ln x\,dx = x \ln x - x + C = x (\ln x - 1) + C$
- $\int \log_a x\,dx = x\log_a x - \frac{x}{\ln a} + C = \frac{x}{\ln a} (\ln x - 1) + C$

=== Trigonometric functions ===
- $\int \sin x \, dx = -\cos x + C$
- $\int \cos x\, dx = \sin x + C$
- $\int \tan x \, dx = \ln\left| \sec x \right| + C = -\ln\left| \cos x \right| + C$
- $\int \cot x \, dx = -\ln\left| \csc x \right| + C = \ln\left| \sin x \right| + C$
- $\int \sec x \, dx = \ln\left| \sec x + \tan x\right| + C = \ln\left| \tan\left(\dfrac{x}{2} + \dfrac{\pi}{4}\right) \right| + C$
  - (See Integral of the secant function. This result was a well-known conjecture in the 17th century.)
- $\int \csc x \, dx = -\ln\left| \csc x + \cot x\right| + C = \ln\left| \csc x - \cot x\right| + C = \ln\left| \tan \frac{x}{2} \right| + C$
- $\int \sec^2 x \, dx = \tan x + C$
- $\int \csc^2 x \, dx = -\cot x + C$
- $\int \sec x \, \tan x \, dx = \sec x + C$
- $\int \csc x \, \cot x \, dx = -\csc x + C$
- $\int \sin^2 x \, dx = \frac{1}{2}\left(x - \frac{\sin 2x}{2} \right) + C = \frac{1}{2}(x - \sin x\cos x ) + C$
- $\int \cos^2 x \, dx = \frac{1}{2}\left(x + \frac{\sin 2x}{2} \right) + C = \frac{1}{2}(x + \sin x\cos x ) + C$
- $\int \tan^2 x \, dx = \tan x - x + C$
- $\int \cot^2 x \, dx = -\cot x - x + C$
- $\int \sec^3 x \, dx = \frac{1}{2}(\sec x \tan x + \ln\left|\sec x + \tan x\right|) + C$
  - (See integral of secant cubed.)
- $\int \csc^3 x \, dx = \frac{1}{2}(-\csc x \cot x + \ln\left|\csc x - \cot x\right|) + C = \frac{1}{2}\left(\ln\left|\tan\frac{x}{2}\right| - \csc x \cot x \right) + C$
- $\int \sin^n x \, dx = - \frac{\sin^{n-1} x \cos x}{n} + \frac{n-1}{n} \int \sin^{n-2} x \, dx$
- $\int \cos^n x \, dx = \frac{\cos^{n-1} x \sin x}{n} + \frac{n-1}{n} \int \cos^{n-2}{x} \, dx$

=== Inverse trigonometric functions ===
- $\int \arcsin{x} \, dx = x \arcsin{x} + \sqrt{1 - x^2} + C , \text{ for } \vert x \vert \le 1$
- $\int \arccos{x} \, dx = x \arccos{x} - \sqrt{1 - x^2} + C , \text{ for } \vert x \vert \le 1$
- $\int \arctan{x} \, dx = x \arctan{x} - \frac{1}{2} \ln { \vert 1 + x^2 \vert } + C , \text{ for all real } x$
- $\int \arccot{x} \, dx = x \arccot{x} + \frac{1}{2} \ln { \vert 1 + x^2 \vert } + C , \text{ for all real } x$
- $\int \arcsec{x} \, dx = x \arcsec{x} - \ln \left\vert x \, \left( 1 + \sqrt{ 1 - x^{-2} } \, \right) \right\vert + C , \text{ for } \vert x \vert \ge 1$
- $\int \arccsc{x} \, dx = x \arccsc{x} + \ln \left\vert x \, \left( 1 + \sqrt{ 1 - x^{-2} } \, \right) \right\vert + C , \text{ for } \vert x \vert \ge 1$

=== Hyperbolic functions ===
- $\int \sinh x \, dx = \cosh x + C$
- $\int \cosh x \, dx = \sinh x + C$
- $\int \tanh x \, dx = \ln(\cosh x) + C$
- $\int \coth x \, dx = \ln \left| \sinh x \right| + C , \text{ for } x \neq 0$
- $\int \operatorname{sech} x \, dx = \arctan(\sinh x) + C$
- $\int \operatorname{csch}\,x \, dx = \ln\left|\operatorname{coth} x - \operatorname{csch} x\right| + C = \ln\left| \tanh {x \over2}\right| + C , \text{ for } x \neq 0$
- $\int \operatorname{sech}^2 x \, dx = \tanh x + C$
- $\int \operatorname{csch}^2 x \, dx = -\operatorname{coth}x + C$
- $\int \operatorname{sech}x \, \operatorname{tanh}x \, dx = -\operatorname{sech}x + C$
- $\int \operatorname{csch}x \, \operatorname{coth}x \, dx = -\operatorname{csch}x + C$

=== Inverse hyperbolic functions ===
- $\int \operatorname{arcsinh} \, x \, dx = x \, \operatorname{arcsinh} \, x - \sqrt{ x^2 + 1 } + C , \text{ for all real } x$
- $\int \operatorname{arccosh} \, x \, dx = x \, \operatorname{arccosh} \, x - \sqrt{ x^2 - 1 } + C , \text{ for } x \ge 1$
- $\int \operatorname{arctanh} \, x \, dx = x \, \operatorname{arctanh} \, x + \frac{\ln\left(\,1-x^2\right)}{2} + C , \text{ for } \vert x \vert < 1$
- $\int \operatorname{arccoth} \, x \, dx = x \, \operatorname{arccoth} \, x + \frac{\ln\left(x^2-1\right)}{2} + C , \text{ for } \vert x \vert > 1$
- $\int \operatorname{arcsech} \, x \, dx = x \, \operatorname{arcsech} \, x + \arcsin x + C , \text{ for } 0 < x \le 1$
- $\int \operatorname{arccsch} \, x \, dx = x \, \operatorname{arccsch} \, x + \left| \operatorname{arcsinh} \, x \right| + C , \text{ for } x \neq 0$

=== Products of functions proportional to their second derivatives ===
- $\int \cos ax\, e^{bx}\, dx = \frac{e^{bx}}{a^2+b^2}\left( a\sin ax + b\cos ax \right) + C$
- $\int \sin ax\, e^{bx}\, dx = \frac{e^{bx}}{a^2+b^2}\left( b\sin ax - a\cos ax \right) + C$
- $\int \cos ax\, \cosh bx\, dx = \frac{1}{a^2+b^2}\left( a\sin ax\, \cosh bx+ b\cos ax\, \sinh bx \right) + C$
- $\int \sin ax\, \cosh bx\, dx = \frac{1}{a^2+b^2}\left( b\sin ax\, \sinh bx- a\cos ax\, \cosh bx \right) + C$

=== Absolute-value functions ===
Let f be a continuous function, that has at most one zero. If f has a zero, let g be the unique antiderivative of f that is zero at the root of f; otherwise, let g be any antiderivative of f. Then
$$\int \left| f(x)\right|\,dx = \sgn(f(x))g(x)+C,$$
where sgn(x) is the sign function, which takes the values −1, 0, 1 when x is respectively negative, zero or positive.

This can be proved by computing the derivative of the right-hand side of the formula, taking into account that the condition on g is here for insuring the continuity of the integral.

This gives the following formulas (where a ≠ 0), which are valid over any interval where f is continuous (over larger intervals, the constant C must be replaced by a piecewise constant function):

- $\int \left| (ax + b)^n \right|\,dx = \sgn(ax + b) {(ax + b)^{n+1} \over a(n+1)} + C$
  when n is odd, and $n \neq -1$.
- $\int \left| \tan{ax} \right|\,dx = -\frac{1}{a}\sgn(\tan{ax}) \ln(\left|\cos{ax}\right|) + C$
  when $ax \in \left( n\pi - \frac{\pi}{2}, n\pi + \frac{\pi}{2} \right)$ for some integer n.
- $\int \left| \csc{ax} \right|\,dx = -\frac{1}{a}\sgn(\csc{ax}) \ln(\left| \csc{ax} + \cot{ax} \right|) + C$
  when $ax \in \left( n\pi, n\pi + \pi \right)$ for some integer n.
- $\int \left| \sec{ax} \right|\,dx = \frac{1}{a}\sgn(\sec{ax}) \ln(\left| \sec{ax} + \tan{ax} \right|) + C$
  when $ax \in \left( n\pi - \frac{\pi}{2}, n\pi + \frac{\pi}{2} \right)$ for some integer n.
- $\int \left| \cot{ax} \right|\,dx = \frac{1}{a}\sgn(\cot{ax}) \ln(\left|\sin{ax}\right|) + C$
  when $ax \in \left( n\pi, n\pi + \pi \right)$ for some integer n.

If the function f does not have any continuous antiderivative which takes the value zero at the zeros of f (this is the case for the sine and the cosine functions), then sgn(f(x)) ∫ f(x) dx is an antiderivative of f on every interval on which f is not zero, but may be discontinuous at the points where f(x) = 0. For having a continuous antiderivative, one has thus to add a well chosen step function. If we also use the fact that the absolute values of sine and cosine are periodic with period π, then we get:

- $\int \left| \sin{ax} \right|\,dx = {2 \over a} \left\lfloor \frac{ax}{\pi} \right\rfloor - {1 \over a} \cos{\left( ax - \left\lfloor \frac{ax}{\pi} \right\rfloor \pi \right)} + C$
- $\int \left|\cos {ax}\right|\,dx = {2 \over a} \left\lfloor \frac{ax}{\pi} + \frac12 \right\rfloor + {1 \over a} \sin{\left( ax - \left\lfloor \frac{ax}{\pi} + \frac12 \right\rfloor \pi \right)} + C$

=== Special functions ===
Ci, Si: Trigonometric integrals, Ei: Exponential integral, li: Logarithmic integral function, erf: Error function

- $\int \operatorname{Ci}(x) \, dx = x \operatorname{Ci}(x) - \sin x$
- $\int \operatorname{Si}(x) \, dx = x \operatorname{Si}(x) + \cos x$
- $\int \operatorname{Ei}(x) \, dx = x \operatorname{Ei}(x) - e^x$
- $\int \operatorname{li}(x) \, dx = x \operatorname{li}(x)-\operatorname{Ei}(2 \ln x)$
- $\int \frac{\operatorname{li}(x)}{x}\,dx = \ln x\, \operatorname{li}(x) -x$
- $\int \operatorname{erf}(x)\, dx = \frac{e^{-x^2}}{\sqrt{\pi }}+x \operatorname{erf}(x)$

== Definite integrals lacking closed-form antiderivatives ==
There are some functions whose antiderivatives cannot be expressed in closed form. However, the values of the definite integrals of some of these functions over some common intervals can be calculated. A few useful integrals are given below.

- $\int_0^\infty \sqrt{x}\,e^{-x}\,dx = \frac{1}{2}\sqrt \pi$ (see also Gamma function)
- $\int_0^\infty e^{-a x^2}\,dx = \frac{1}{2} \sqrt \frac {\pi} {a}$ for a > 0 (the Gaussian integral)
- $\int_0^\infty{x^2 e^{-a x^2}\,dx} = \frac{1}{4} \sqrt \frac {\pi} {a^3}$ for a > 0
- $\int_0^\infty x^{2n} e^{-a x^2}\,dx = \frac{2n-1}{2a} \int_0^\infty x^{2(n-1)} e^{-a x^2}\,dx = \frac{(2n-1)!!}{2^{n+1}} \sqrt{\frac{\pi}{a^{2n+1}}} = \frac{(2n)!}{n! 2^{2n+1}} \sqrt{\frac{\pi}{a^{2n+1}}}$
  for a > 0, n is a positive integer and !! is the double factorial.
- $\int_0^\infty{x^3 e^{-a x^2}\,dx} = \frac{1}{2 a^2}$ when a > 0
- $\int_0^\infty x^{2n+1} e^{-a x^2}\,dx = \frac {n} {a} \int_0^\infty x^{2n-1} e^{-a x^2}\,dx = \frac{n!}{2 a^{n+1}}$
  for a > 0, n = 0, 1, 2, ....
- $\int_0^\infty x^n e^{-ax^b} dx = \frac{1}{b}\ a^{-\frac{n+1}{b}}\Gamma\left(\frac{n+1}{b}\right)$
- $\int_0^\infty \frac{x}{e^x-1}\,dx = \frac{\pi^2}{6}$ (see also Bernoulli number)
- $\int_0^\infty \frac{x^2}{e^x-1}\,dx = 2\zeta(3) \approx 2.40$
- $\int_0^\infty \frac{x^3}{e^x-1}\,dx = \frac{\pi^4}{15}$ (used in the derivation of Planck's law in physics)
- $\int_0^\infty \frac{x^n}{e^x-1}\,dx = \Gamma(n+1) \zeta(n+1)$ for $n > 0$ (see also Riemann zeta function)
- $\int_0^\infty \frac{\sin{x}}{x}\,dx = \frac{\pi}{2}$ (see sinc function and the Dirichlet integral)
- $\int_0^\infty\frac{\sin^2{x}}{x^2}\,dx = \frac{\pi}{2}$
- $$\int_{0}^\frac{\pi}{2}\sin^n x\,dx=\int_{0}^\frac{\pi}{2}\cos^n x\,dx=\frac{(n-1)!!}{n!!} \times \begin{cases}
1 & \text{if } n \text{ is odd} \\
\frac{\pi}{2} & \text{if } n \text{ is even.}
\end{cases}$$
  (if n is a positive integer and !! is the double factorial).
- $$\int_{-\pi}^\pi \cos(\alpha x)\cos^n(\beta x) dx = \begin{cases}
\frac{2 \pi}{2^n} \binom{n}{m} & |\alpha|= |\beta (2m-n)| \\
0 & \text{otherwise}
\end{cases}$$
  (for α, β, m, n integers with β ≠ 0 and m, n ≥ 0, see also Binomial coefficient)
- $\int_{-t}^t \sin^m(\alpha x) \cos^n(\beta x) dx = 0$
  (for α, β real, n a non-negative integer, and m an odd, positive integer; since the integrand is odd)
- $$\int_{-\pi}^\pi \sin(\alpha x) \sin^n(\beta x) dx = \begin{cases}
(-1)^{\left(\frac{n+1}{2}\right)} (-1)^m \frac{2 \pi}{2^n} \binom{n}{m} & n \text{ odd},\ \alpha = \beta (2m-n) \\
0 & \text{otherwise}
\end{cases}$$
  (for α, β, m, n integers with β ≠ 0 and m, n ≥ 0, see also Binomial coefficient)
- $$\int_{-\pi}^{\pi} \cos(\alpha x) \sin^n(\beta x) dx = \begin{cases}
(-1)^{\left(\frac{n}{2}\right)} (-1)^m \frac{2 \pi}{2^n} \binom{n}{m} & n \text{ even},\ |\alpha| = |\beta (2m-n)| \\
0 & \text{otherwise}
\end{cases}$$
  (for α, β, m, n integers with β ≠ 0 and m, n ≥ 0, see also Binomial coefficient)
- $\int_{-\infty}^\infty e^{-(ax^2+bx+c)}\,dx = \sqrt{\frac{\pi}{a}}\exp\left[\frac{b^2-4ac}{4a}\right]$
  (where exp[u] is the exponential function e^{u}, and a > 0.)
- $\int_0^\infty x^{z-1}\,e^{-x}\,dx = \Gamma(z)$
  (where $\Gamma(z)$ is the Gamma function)
- $\int_0^1 \left(\ln\frac{1}{x}\right)^p\,dx = \Gamma(p+1)$
- $\int_0^1 x^{\alpha-1}(1-x)^{\beta-1} dx = \frac{\Gamma(\alpha)\Gamma(\beta)}{\Gamma(\alpha+\beta)}$
  (for Re(α) > 0 and Re(β) > 0, see Beta function)
- $\int_0^{2 \pi} e^{x \cos \theta} d \theta = 2 \pi I_{0}(x)$ (where I_{0}(x) is the modified Bessel function of the first kind)
- $\int_0^{2 \pi} e^{x \cos \theta + y \sin \theta} d \theta = 2 \pi I_{0} \left(\sqrt{x^2 + y^2}\right)$
- $\int_{-\infty}^\infty \left(1 + \frac{x^2}{\nu}\right)^{-\frac{\nu + 1}{2}}\,dx = \frac { \sqrt{\nu \pi} \ \Gamma\left(\frac{\nu}{2}\right)} {\Gamma\left(\frac{\nu + 1}{2}\right)}$
  (for ν > 0 , this is related to the probability density function of Student's t-distribution)

If the function f has bounded variation on the interval [a,b], then the method of exhaustion provides a formula for the integral:
$$\int_a^b{f(x)\,dx} = (b - a) \sum\limits_{n = 1}^\infty  {\sum\limits_{m = 1}^{2^n  - 1} {\left( { - 1} \right)^{m + 1} } } 2^{ - n} f(a + m\left( {b - a} \right)2^{-n} ).$$

The "sophomore's dream":
$$\begin{align}
\int_0^1 x^{-x}\,dx &= \sum_{n=1}^\infty n^{-n}     &&(= 1.29128\,59970\,6266\dots)\\[6pt]
\int_0^1 x^x   \,dx &= -\sum_{n=1}^\infty (-n)^{-n} &&(= 0.78343\,05107\,1213\dots)
\end{align}$$
attributed to Johann Bernoulli.

== See also ==
- Differentiation rules – Rules for computing derivatives of functions
- Incomplete gamma function – Types of special mathematical functions
- Indefinite sum – Inverse of a finite difference
- Integration using Euler's formula – Use of complex numbers to evaluate integrals
- Liouville's theorem (differential algebra) – Criterion for integration in terms of elementary functions
- List of limits
- List of mathematical identities
- List of mathematical series
- Nonelementary integral – Integrals not expressible in closed-form from elementary functions
- Symbolic integration – Computation of an antiderivatives
