= Lists of mathematics topics =

These lists cover a variety of topics related to mathematics. Some link to hundreds of articles, others only a few. They cover, for example: aspects of basic and advanced mathematics, methodology, general concepts, reference tables, mathematical societies, and mathematicians.

The purpose of this list is not similar to that of the Mathematics Subject Classification formulated by the American Mathematical Society. Many mathematics journals ask authors of research papers and expository articles to list subject codes from the Mathematics Subject Classification in their papers. The subject codes so listed are used by the two major reviewing databases, Mathematical Reviews and Zentralblatt MATH. This list has some items that would not fit in such a classification, such as list of exponential topics and list of factorial and binomial topics, which may surprise the reader with the diversity of their coverage.

== Basic mathematics ==
This branch is typically taught in secondary education or in the first year of university.

- Outline of arithmetic
- Outline of discrete mathematics
- List of calculus topics
- List of geometry topics
  - Outline of geometry
  - List of trigonometry topics
    - Outline of trigonometry
    - List of trigonometric identities
- List of logarithmic identities
  - List of integrals of logarithmic functions
- List of set identities and relations
- List of topics in logic

== Areas of advanced mathematics ==
As a rough guide, this list is divided into pure and applied sections although in reality, these branches are overlapping and intertwined.

=== Pure mathematics ===
==== Algebra ====
Algebra includes the study of algebraic structures, which are sets and operations defined on these sets satisfying certain axioms. The field of algebra is further divided according to which structure is studied; for instance, group theory concerns an algebraic structure called group.

- Outline of algebra
  - Glossary of field theory
  - Glossary of ring theory
  - List of abstract algebra topics
  - List of algebraic structures
  - List of Boolean algebra topics
  - List of category theory topics
  - List of cohomology theories
  - List of commutative algebra topics
  - List of homological algebra topics
  - List of group theory topics
    - Glossary of group theory
  - List of representation theory topics
  - List of linear algebra topics
    - Glossary of linear algebra
  - List of reciprocity laws

==== Calculus and analysis ====
Fourier series approximation of square wave in five steps.

Calculus studies the computation of limits, derivatives, and integrals of functions of real numbers, and in particular studies instantaneous rates of change. Analysis evolved from calculus.

- Outline of calculus
- Outline of vector identities
- Glossary of tensor theory
- List of complex analysis topics
- List of functional analysis topics
  - List of vector spaces in mathematics
- List of integration and measure theory topics
- List of harmonic analysis topics
  - List of Fourier analysis topics
- List of mathematical series
- List of multivariable calculus topics
- List of q-analogs
- List of real analysis topics
- List of variational topics
- See also Dynamical systems and differential equations section below.

==== Geometry and topology ====
Ford circles—A circle rests upon each fraction in lowest terms. Each touches its neighbors without crossing.

Geometry is initially the study of spatial figures like circles and cubes, though it has been generalized considerably. Topology developed from geometry; it looks at those properties that do not change even when the figures are deformed by stretching and bending, like dimension.

- Outline of geometry
  - Glossary of differential geometry and topology
  - Glossary of Riemannian and metric geometry
  - Glossary of scheme theory
  - List of algebraic geometry topics
    - List of complex and algebraic surfaces
  - List of circle topics
    - List of topics related to π
  - List of curves topics
  - List of differential geometry topics
  - Lists of shapes
    - List of two-dimensional geometric shapes
  - List of knot theory topics
  - List of Lie groups topics
  - List of mathematical properties of points
  - List of triangle topics
- List of topology topics
  - List of general topology topics
    - Glossary of general topology
  - List of topologies
  - Topological property
  - List of algebraic topology topics
    - List of cohomology theories
- List of geometric topology topics

==== Combinatorics ====
Combinatorics concerns the study of discrete (and usually finite) objects. Aspects include "counting" the objects satisfying certain criteria (enumerative combinatorics), deciding when the criteria can be met, and constructing and analyzing objects meeting the criteria (as in combinatorial designs and matroid theory), finding "largest", "smallest", or "optimal" objects (extremal combinatorics and combinatorial optimization), and finding algebraic structures these objects may have (algebraic combinatorics).

- Outline of combinatorics
- Glossary of graph theory
- List of graph theory topics

==== Logic ====
Venn diagrams are illustrations of set theoretical, mathematical or logical relationships.

Logic is the foundation that underlies mathematical logic and the rest of mathematics. It tries to formalize valid reasoning. In particular, it attempts to define what constitutes a proof.

- Outline of logic
  - List of Boolean algebra topics
  - List of first-order theories
  - List of large cardinal properties
  - List of mathematical logic topics
  - List of set theory topics
  - Glossary of order theory

==== Number theory ====
The branch of mathematics deals with the properties and relationships of numbers, especially positive integers. Number theory is a branch of pure mathematics devoted primarily to the study of the integers and integer-valued functions. German mathematician Carl Friedrich Gauss said, "Mathematics is the queen of the sciences—and number theory is the queen of mathematics." Number theory also studies the natural, or whole, numbers. One of the central concepts in number theory is that of the prime number, and there are many questions about primes that appear simple but whose resolution continues to elude mathematicians.

- List of number theory topics
  - List of algebraic number theory topics
  - List of recreational number theory topics
  - Glossary of arithmetic and Diophantine geometry
  - List of prime numbers—not just a table, but a list of various kinds of prime numbers (each with an accompanying table)
  - List of zeta functions

=== Applied mathematics ===
==== Dynamical systems and differential equations ====
Phase portrait of a continuous-time dynamical system, the Van der Pol oscillator.

A differential equation is an equation involving an unknown function and its derivatives.

In a dynamical system, a fixed rule describes the time dependence of a point in a geometrical space. The mathematical models used to describe the swinging of a clock pendulum, the flow of water in a pipe, or the number of fish each spring in a lake are examples of dynamical systems.

- List of dynamical systems and differential equations topics
- List of nonlinear partial differential equations
- List of partial differential equation topics

==== Mathematical physics ====
Mathematical physics is concerned with "the application of mathematics to problems in physics and the development of mathematical methods suitable for such applications and for the formulation of physical theories".^{1}

- List of mathematical topics in classical mechanics
- List of mathematical topics in quantum theory
- List of mathematical topics in relativity
- List of string theory topics
- Index of wave articles

==== Theory of computation ====
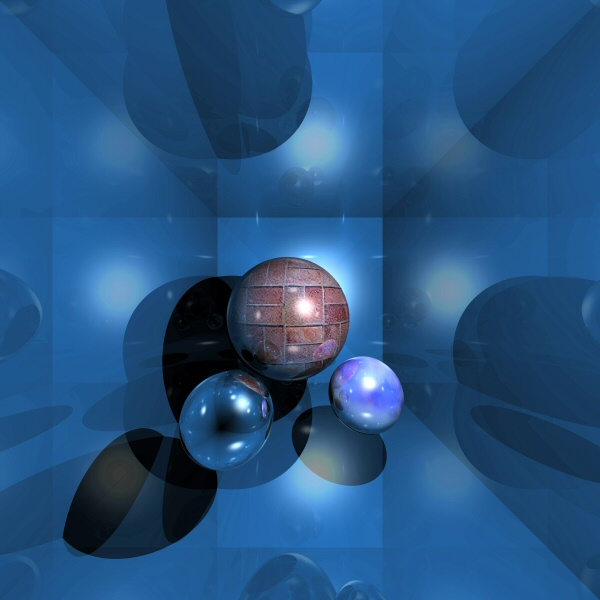
Ray tracing is a process based on computational mathematics.

The fields of mathematics and computing intersect both in computer science, the study of algorithms and data structures, and in scientific computing, the study of algorithmic methods for solving problems in mathematics, science, and engineering.

- List of algorithm general topics
- List of computability and complexity topics
- Lists for computational topics in geometry and graphics
  - List of combinatorial computational geometry topics
  - List of computer graphics and descriptive geometry topics
  - List of numerical computational geometry topics
- List of computer vision topics
- List of formal language and literal string topics
- List of numerical analysis topics

==== Information theory and signal processing ====
Information theory is a branch of applied mathematics and social science involving the quantification of information. Historically, information theory was developed to find fundamental limits on compressing and reliably communicating data.

Signal processing is the analysis, interpretation, and manipulation of signals. Signals of interest include sound, images, biological signals such as ECG, radar signals, and many others. Processing of such signals includes filtering, storage and reconstruction, separation of information from noise, compression, and feature extraction.

- List of algebraic coding theory topics
- List of information theory topics
- List of cryptography topics

==== Probability and statistics ====
The "bell curve"—the probability density function of the normal distribution.

Probability theory is the formalization and study of the mathematics of uncertain events or knowledge. The related field of mathematical statistics develops statistical theory with mathematics. Statistics, the science concerned with collecting and analyzing data, is an autonomous discipline (and not a subdiscipline of applied mathematics).

- Lists of statistics topics
  - Catalog of articles in probability theory
  - List of probability topics
  - List of stochastic processes topics
  - List of probability distributions
  - List of statistics articles
  - Outline of regression analysis

==== Game theory ====
Game theory is a branch of mathematics that uses models to study interactions with formalized incentive structures ("games"). It has applications in a variety of fields, including economics, anthropology, political science, social psychology and military strategy.

- Glossary of game theory
- List of games in game theory

==== Operations research ====
Operations research is the study and use of mathematical models, statistics, and algorithms to aid in decision-making, typically with the goal of improving or optimizing the performance of real-world systems.

- List of knapsack problems
- List of network theory topics

== Methodology ==
- List of graphical methods
- List of mathematics-based methods
- List of rules of inference

== Mathematical statements ==
A mathematical statement amounts to a proposition or assertion of some mathematical fact, formula, or construction. Such statements include axioms and the theorems that may be proved from them, conjectures that may be unproven or even unprovable, and also algorithms for computing the answers to questions that can be expressed mathematically.

- List of algorithms
- List of axioms
- List of conjectures
  - List of conjectures by Paul Erdős
- Combinatorial principles
- List of equations
- List of formulae involving pi
- List of representations of e
- List of inequalities
- List of lemmas
- List of mathematical identities
- List of mathematical proofs
  - List of long mathematical proofs
  - List of incomplete proofs
- List of theorems

== General concepts ==
- List of convexity topics
- List of dualities
- List of exceptional set concepts
- List of exponential topics
- List of factorial and binomial topics
- List of fractal topics
- List of logarithm topics
- List of mathematical properties of points
- List of numeral system topics
- List of order topics
- List of partition topics
- List of permutation topics
- List of polynomial topics
- List of properties of sets of reals
- List of transforms

== Mathematical objects ==
Among mathematical objects are numbers, functions, sets, a great variety of things called "spaces" of one kind or another, algebraic structures such as rings, groups, or fields, and many other things.

- List of mathematical examples
- List of algebraic surfaces
- List of curves
- List of complex reflection groups
- List of complexity classes
- List of examples in general topology
- List of Euclidean uniform tilings
- List of finite simple groups
- List of Fourier-related transforms
- List of manifolds
- List of mathematical constants
- List of mathematical functions
- List of mathematical knots and links
- List of mathematical shapes
- List of mathematical spaces
- List of matrices
- List of numbers
- List of polygons, polyhedra and polytopes
- List of regular polytopes
- List of simple Lie groups
- List of small groups
- List of special functions and eponyms
- List of surfaces
- List of uniform polyhedra
- List of uniform polyhedra by Schwarz triangle
- List of uniform tilings on the sphere, plane, and hyperbolic plane
- Table of Lie groups

== About mathematics ==
- List of letters used in mathematics and science
- List of mathematical societies
- List of mathematics competitions
- List of mathematics history topics
- List of publications in mathematics
- List of mathematics journals

=== Mathematicians ===
Mathematicians study and research in all the different areas of mathematics.

- List of films about mathematicians
- List of game theorists
- List of geometers
- List of logicians
- List of mathematicians
- List of mathematical probabilists
- List of statisticians

=== Work of particular mathematicians ===
- List of things named after Niels Henrik Abel
- List of things named after George Airy
- List of things named after Jean d'Alembert
- List of things named after Archimedes
- List of things named after Vladimir Arnold
- List of things named after Emil Artin
- List of things named after Stefan Banach
- List of things named after Thomas Bayes
- List of things named after members of the Bernoulli family
- List of things named after Jakob Bernoulli
- List of things named after Friedrich Bessel
- List of things named after Élie Cartan
- List of things named after Augustin-Louis Cauchy
- List of things named after Arthur Cayley
- List of things named after Pafnuty Chebyshev
- List of things named after John Horton Conway
- List of things named after Richard Dedekind
- List of things named after Pierre Deligne
- List of things named after Peter Gustav Lejeune Dirichlet
- List of things named after Albert Einstein
- List of things named after Euclid
- List of things named after Leonhard Euler
- List of things named after Paul Erdős
- List of things named after Pierre de Fermat
- List of things named after Fibonacci
- List of things named after Joseph Fourier
- List of things named after Erik Fredholm
- List of things named after Ferdinand Georg Frobenius
- List of things named after Carl Friedrich Gauss
- List of things named after Évariste Galois
- List of things named after Hermann Grassmann
- List of things named after Alexander Grothendieck
- List of things named after Jacques Hadamard
- List of things named after William Rowan Hamilton
- List of things named after Erich Hecke
- List of things named after Eduard Heine
- List of things named after Charles Hermite
- List of things named after David Hilbert
- List of things named after W. V. D. Hodge
- List of things named after Carl Gustav Jacob Jacobi
- List of things named after Johannes Kepler
- List of things named after Felix Klein
- List of things named after Joseph-Louis Lagrange
- List of things named after Johann Lambert
- List of things named after Pierre-Simon Laplace
- List of things named after Adrien-Marie Legendre
- List of things named after Gottfried Leibniz
- List of things named after Sophus Lie
- List of things named after Joseph Liouville
- List of things named after Andrey Markov
- List of things named after John Milnor
- List of things named after Hermann Minkowski
- List of things named after John von Neumann
- List of things named after Isaac Newton
- List of things named after Emmy Noether
- List of things named after Henri Poincaré
- List of things named after Siméon Denis Poisson
- List of things named after Pythagoras
- List of things named after Srinivasa Ramanujan
- List of things named after Bernhard Riemann
- List of things named after Issai Schur
- List of things named after Anatoliy Skorokhod
- List of things named after George Gabriel Stokes
- List of things named after Jean-Pierre Serre
- List of things named after James Joseph Sylvester
- List of things named after Alfred Tarski
- List of things named after Alan Turing
- List of things named after Stanislaw Ulam
- List of things named after Karl Weierstrass
- List of things named after André Weil
- List of things named after Hermann Weyl
- List of things named after Norbert Wiener
- List of things named after Ernst Witt

== Reference tables ==
- List of mathematical reference tables
- List of moments of inertia
- Table of derivatives

=== Integrals ===
In calculus, the integral of a function is a generalization of area, mass, volume, sum, and total. The following pages list the integrals of many different functions.

- Lists of integrals
- List of integrals of exponential functions
- List of integrals of Gaussian functions
- List of integrals of hyperbolic functions
- List of integrals of inverse hyperbolic functions
- List of integrals of inverse trigonometric functions
- List of integrals of irrational functions
- List of integrals of logarithmic functions
- List of integrals of rational functions
- List of integrals of trigonometric functions

== Journals ==
- List of mathematics journals
- List of mathematics education journals
- Category:History of science journals
- Category:Philosophy of science literature

== Meta-lists ==
- Glossary of mathematical symbols
- List of important publications in mathematics
- List of important publications in statistics
- List of mathematical theories
- List of mathematics categories
- List of mathematical symbols by subject
- Table of logic symbols
- Table of mathematical symbols

== See also ==
- Areas of mathematics
- Computational mathematics
- Glossary of areas of mathematics
- Timeline of women in mathematics

== Others ==
- Lists of unsolved problems in mathematics
- List of order theory topics
- List of topics related to π
- Scientific equations named after people

== Notes ==
- ^Note 1: Definition from the Journal of Mathematical Physics .

== External links and references ==
- 2020 Mathematics Subject Classification from the American Mathematical Society, scheme authors find many mathematics research journals asking them to use to classify their submissions; those published then include these classifications.
- The Mathematical Atlas
- Maths Formula
- PlanetMath
- Paul's Online Notes
- ProofWiki
- The Encyclopedia of Mathematics
