= List of mathematical examples =

This page will attempt to list examples in mathematics. To qualify for inclusion, an article should be about a mathematical object with a fair amount of concreteness. Usually a definition of an abstract concept, a theorem, or a proof would not be an "example" as the term should be understood here (an elegant proof of an isolated but particularly striking fact, as opposed to a proof of a general theorem, could perhaps be considered an "example"). The discussion page for list of mathematical topics has some comments on this. Eventually this page may have its own discussion page. This page links to itself in order that edits to this page will be included among related changes when the user clicks on that button.

The concrete example within the article titled Rao–Blackwell theorem is perhaps one of the best ways for a probabilist ignorant of statistical inference to get a quick impression of the flavor of that subject.

== Uncategorized examples, alphabetized ==
- Alexander horned sphere
- All horses are the same color
- Cantor function
- Cantor set
- Checking if a coin is biased
- Concrete illustration of the central limit theorem
- Differential equations of mathematical physics
- Dirichlet function
- Discontinuous linear map
- Efron's non-transitive dice
- Example of a game without a value
- Examples of contour integration
- Examples of differential equations
- Examples of generating functions
- List of space groups
- Examples of Markov chains
- Examples of vector spaces
- Fano plane
- Frieze group
- Gray graph
- Hall–Janko graph
- Higman–Sims graph
- Hilbert matrix
- Illustration of a low-discrepancy sequence
- Illustration of the central limit theorem
- An infinitely differentiable function that is not analytic
- Leech lattice
- Lewy's example on PDEs
- List of finite simple groups
- Long line
- Normally distributed and uncorrelated does not imply independent
- Pairwise independence of random variables need not imply mutual independence.
- Petersen graph
- Sierpinski space
- Simple example of Azuma's inequality for coin flips
- Proof that 22/7 exceeds π
- Solenoid (mathematics)
- Sorgenfrey plane
- Stein's example
- Three cards and a top hat
- Topologist's sine curve
- Tsirelson space
- Tutte eight cage
- Weierstrass function
- Wilkinson's polynomial
- Wallpaper group
- Uses of trigonometry (The "examples" in that article are not mathematical objects, i.e., numbers, functions, equations, sets, etc., but applications of trigonometry or scientific fields to which trigonometry is applied.)

== Specialized lists of mathematical examples ==
- List of algebraic surfaces
- List of curves
- List of complexity classes
- List of examples in general topology
- List of finite simple groups
- List of Fourier-related transforms
- List of mathematical functions
- List of knots
  - List of mathematical knots and links
- List of manifolds
- List of mathematical shapes
- List of matrices
- List of numbers
- List of polygons, polyhedra and polytopes
- List of prime numbers —not merely a numerical table, but a list of various kinds of prime numbers, each with a table
- List of regular polytopes
- List of surfaces
- List of small groups
- Table of Lie groups

== Sporadic groups ==
See also list of finite simple groups.

- Baby Monster group
- Conway group
- Fischer groups
- Harada–Norton group
- Held group
- Higman–Sims group
- Janko groups
- Lyons group
- The Mathieu groups
- McLaughlin group
- Monster group
- O'Nan group
- Rudvalis group
- Suzuki sporadic group
- Thompson group

== See also ==
- Counterexample
- List of examples in general topology
