= List of homological algebra topics =

Homological algebra is the study of homological functors

This is a list of homological algebra topics, by Wikipedia page.

Homological algebra is the branch of mathematics that studies homology in a general algebraic setting. It is a relatively young discipline, whose origins can be traced to investigations in combinatorial topology (a precursor to algebraic topology) and abstract algebra (theory of modules and syzygies) at the end of the 19th century, chiefly by Henri Poincaré and David Hilbert.

Homological algebra is the study of homological functors and the intricate algebraic structures that they entail; its development was closely intertwined with the emergence of category theory. A central concept is that of chain complexes, which can be studied through their homology and cohomology.

== Basic techniques ==
- Cokernel
- Exact sequence
- Chain complex
- Differential module
- Five lemma
- Short five lemma
- Snake lemma
- Nine lemma
- Extension (algebra)
  - Central extension
  - Splitting lemma
- Projective module
- Injective module
- Projective resolution
- Injective resolution
- Koszul complex
- Exact functor
- Derived functor
- Ext functor
- Tor functor
- Filtration (abstract algebra)
- Spectral sequence
- Abelian category
- Triangulated category
- Derived category

== Applications ==
- Group cohomology
- Galois cohomology
- Lie algebra cohomology
- Sheaf cohomology
- Whitehead problem
- Homological conjectures in commutative algebra
