= Variational =

Variational may refer to:

- Calculus of variations, a field of mathematical analysis that deals with maximizing or minimizing functionals
- Variational method (quantum mechanics), a way of finding approximations to the lowest energy eigenstate or ground state in quantum physics
- Variational Bayesian methods, a family of techniques for approximating integrals in Bayesian inference and machine learning
- Variational properties, properties of an organism relating to the production of variation among its offspring in evolutionary biology
- Variationist sociolinguistics or variational sociolinguistics, the study of variation in language use among speakers or groups of speakers

== See also ==
- List of variational topics in mathematics and physics
- Variation (disambiguation)
