= List of mathematics reference tables =

This list of mathematics reference tables uses the term reference tables broadly for Wikipedia pages that organize mathematical information in forms suited to convenient reference or lookup, rather than necessarily presenting it in tabular form. It includes indexes, lists, tables, compilations, and chronologies covering mathematical topics and results, mathematical objects and quantities, formulas and identities, symbols and coefficients, and other commonly referenced mathematical information.

== Reference tables ==
- List of mathematical topics
- List of statistical topics
- List of mathematical functions
- List of mathematical theorems
- List of mathematical proofs
- List of matrices
- List of numbers
- List of relativistic equations
- List of small groups
- Mathematical constants
- Sporadic group
- Table of Clebsch-Gordan coefficients
- Table of derivatives
- Table of divisors
- Table of integrals
- Table of mathematical symbols
- Table of prime factors
- Taylor series
- Timeline of mathematics
- Trigonometric identities
- Truth table
