= List of mathematical proofs =

A list of articles with mathematical proofs:

== Theorems of which articles are primarily devoted to proving them ==
- Bertrand's postulate and a proof
- Estimation of covariance matrices
- Fermat's little theorem and some proofs
- Gödel's completeness theorem and its original proof
- Mathematical induction and a proof
- Proof that 0.999... equals 1
- Proof that 22/7 exceeds π
- Proof that e is irrational
- Proof that π is irrational
- Proof that the sum of the reciprocals of the primes diverges

== Articles devoted to theorems of which a (sketch of a) proof is given ==
- Banach fixed-point theorem
- Banach–Tarski paradox
- Basel problem
- Bolzano–Weierstrass theorem
- Brouwer fixed-point theorem
- Buckingham π theorem (proof in progress)
- Burnside's lemma
- Cantor's theorem
- Cantor–Bernstein–Schroeder theorem
- Cayley's formula
- Cayley's theorem
- Clique problem (to do)
- Compactness theorem (very compact proof)
- Erdős–Ko–Rado theorem
- Euler's formula
- Euler's four-square identity
- Euler's theorem
- Five color theorem
- Five lemma
- Fundamental theorem of arithmetic
- Gauss–Markov theorem (brief pointer to proof)
- Gödel's incompleteness theorem
  - Gödel's first incompleteness theorem
  - Gödel's second incompleteness theorem
- Goodstein's theorem
- Green's theorem (to do)
  - Green's theorem when D is a simple region
- Heine–Borel theorem
- Intermediate value theorem
- Itô's lemma
- Kőnig's lemma
- Kőnig's theorem (set theory)
- Kőnig's theorem (graph theory)
- Lagrange's theorem (group theory)
- Lagrange's theorem (number theory)
- Liouville's theorem (complex analysis)
- Markov's inequality (proof of a generalization)
- Mean value theorem
- Multivariate normal distribution (to do)
- Holomorphic functions are analytic
- Pythagorean theorem
- Quadratic equation
- Quotient rule
- Ramsey's theorem
- Rao–Blackwell theorem
- Rice's theorem
- Rolle's theorem
- Splitting lemma
- squeeze theorem
- Sum rule in differentiation
- Sum rule in integration
- Sylow theorems
- Transcendence of e and π (as corollaries of Lindemann–Weierstrass)
- Tychonoff's theorem (to do)
- Ultrafilter lemma
- Ultraparallel theorem
- Urysohn's lemma
- Van der Waerden's theorem
- Wilson's theorem
- Zorn's lemma

== Articles devoted to algorithms in which their correctness is proved ==
- Bellman–Ford algorithm (to do)
- Euclidean algorithm
- Kruskal's algorithm
- Gale–Shapley algorithm
- Prim's algorithm
- Shor's algorithm (incomplete)

== Articles where example statements are proved ==
- Basis (linear algebra)
- Burrows–Abadi–Needham logic
- Direct proof
- Generating a vector space
- Linear independence
- Polynomial
- Proof
- Pumping lemma
- Simpson's rule

== Other articles containing proofs ==
- Accumulation point
- Addition in N
  - associativity of addition in N
  - commutativity of addition in N
  - uniqueness of addition in N
- Algorithmic information theory
- Boolean ring
  - commutativity of a boolean ring
- Boolean satisfiability problem
  - NP-completeness of the Boolean satisfiability problem
- Cantor's diagonal argument
  - set is smaller than its power set
  - uncountability of the real numbers
- Cantor's first uncountability proof
  - uncountability of the real numbers
- Combinatorics
- Combinatory logic
- Co-NP
- Coset
- Countable
  - countability of a subset of a countable set (to do)
- Angle of parallelism
- Galois group
  - Fundamental theorem of Galois theory (to do)
- Gödel number
  - Gödel's incompleteness theorem
- Group (mathematics)
- Halting problem
  - insolubility of the halting problem
- Harmonic series (mathematics)
  - divergence of the (standard) harmonic series
- Highly composite number
- Area of hyperbolic sector, basis of hyperbolic angle
- Infinite series
  - convergence of the geometric series with first term 1 and ratio 1/2
- Integer partition
- Irrational number
  - irrationality of log_{2}3
  - irrationality of the square root of 2
- Mathematical induction
  - sum identity
- Power rule
  - differential of x^{n}
- Product and Quotient Rules
- Derivation of Product and Quotient rules for differentiating.
- Prime number
  - Infinitude of the prime numbers
- Primitive recursive function
- Principle of bivalence
  - no propositions are neither true nor false in intuitionistic logic
- Recursion
- Relational algebra (to do)
- Solvable group
- Square root of 2
- Tetris
- Algebra of sets
  - idempotent laws for set union and intersection

== Articles which mention dependencies of theorems ==
- Cauchy's integral formula
- Cauchy integral theorem
- Computational geometry
- Fundamental theorem of algebra
- Lambda calculus
- Invariance of domain
- Minkowski inequality
- Nash embedding theorem
- Open mapping theorem (functional analysis)
- Product topology
- Riemann integral
- Time hierarchy theorem
  - Deterministic time hierarchy theorem

== Proofs using... ==
=== topology ===
- Furstenberg's proof of the infinitude of primes

== Articles giving mathematical proofs within a physical model ==
- No-cloning theorem
- Torque

== See also ==
- Gödel's ontological proof
- Invalid proof
- List of theorems
- List of incomplete proofs
- List of long proofs
