= List of mathematical topics in classical mechanics =

This is a list of mathematical topics in classical mechanics, by Wikipedia page. See also list of variational topics, correspondence principle.

== Newtonian physics ==
- Newton's laws of motion
- Inertia,
- Kinematics, rigid body
- Momentum, kinetic energy
- Parallelogram of force
- Circular motion
  - Rotational speed
  - Angular speed
- Angular momentum
  - torque
  - angular acceleration
  - moment of inertia
    - parallel axes rule
    - perpendicular axes rule
    - stretch rule
  - centripetal force, centrifugal force, Reactive centrifugal force
  - Laplace–Runge–Lenz vector
- Euler's disk
- elastic potential energy
- Mechanical equilibrium
- D'Alembert's principle
- Degrees of freedom (physics and chemistry)
- Frame of reference
- Inertial frame of reference
- Galilean transformation
- Principle of relativity

== Conservation laws ==
- Conservation of momentum
  - Conservation of linear momentum
  - Conservation of angular momentum
- Conservation of energy
  - Potential energy
- Conservative force
- Conservation of mass

== Law of universal gravitation ==
- Projectile motion
- Kepler's laws of planetary motion
- Escape velocity
- Potential well
- Weightlessness
- Lagrangian point
- N-body problem
- Kolmogorov–Arnold–Moser theorem
- Virial theorem
- Gravitational binding energy
- Speed of gravity
- Newtonian limit
- Hill sphere
- Roche lobe
- Roche limit

== Hamiltonian mechanics ==
- Phase space
- Symplectic manifold
- Liouville's theorem (Hamiltonian)
- Poisson bracket
  - Poisson algebra
  - Poisson manifold
  - Antibracket algebra
- Hamiltonian constraint
- Moment map
- Contact geometry
- Analysis of flows
- Nambu mechanics

== Lagrangian mechanics ==
- Action (physics)
- Lagrangian
- Euler–Lagrange equations
- Noether's theorem
