= List of mathematical properties of points =

In mathematics, the following appear:

- Algebraic point
- Associated point
- Base point
- Closed point
- Divisor point
- Embedded point
- Extreme point
- Fermat point
- Fixed point
- Focal point
- Geometric point
- Hyperbolic equilibrium point
- Ideal point
- Inflection point
- Integral point
- Isolated point
- Generic point
- Heegner point
- Lattice hole, Lattice point
- Lebesgue point
- Midpoint
- Napoleon points
- Non-singular point
- Normal point
- Parshin point
- Periodic point
- Pinch point
- Point (geometry)
- Point source
- Rational point
- Recurrent point
- Regular point, Regular singular point
- Saddle point
- Semistable point
- Separable point
- Simple point
- Singular point of a curve
- Singular point of an algebraic variety
- Smooth point
- Special point
- Stable point
- Torsion point
- Vertex (curve)
- Weierstrass point

== Calculus ==
- Critical point (a.k.a. stationary point), any value v in the domain of a differentiable function of any real or complex variable, such that the derivative of v is 0 or undefined

== Geometry ==
- Antipodal point, the point diametrically opposite to another point on a sphere, such that a line drawn between them passes through the centre of the sphere and forms a true diameter
- Conjugate point, any point that can almost be joined to another by a 1-parameter family of geodesics (e.g., the antipodes of a sphere, which are linkable by any meridian
- Vertex (geometry), a point that describes a corner or intersection of a geometric shape
  - Apex (geometry), the vertex that is in some sense the highest of the figure to which it belongs

== Topology ==
- Adherent point, a point x in topological space X such that every open set containing x contains at least one point of a subset A
- Condensation point, any point p of a subset S of a topological space, such that every open neighbourhood of p contains uncountably many points of S
- Limit point, a set S in a topological space X is a point x (which is in X, but not necessarily in S) that can be approximated by points of S, since every neighbourhood of x with respect to the topology on X also contains a point of S other than x itself
  - Accumulation point (or cluster point), a point x ∈ X of a sequence (x_{n})_{n ∈ N} for which there are, for every neighbourhood V of x, infinitely many natural numbers n such that x_{n} ∈ V

== See also ==
- Functor of points
- Lists of mathematics topics
- Triangle center – Point in a triangle that can be seen as its middle under some criteria
- Category:Triangle centers, special points associated with triangles
