= List of mathematical identities =

This article lists mathematical identities, that is, identically true relations holding in mathematics.

- Binet-cauchy identity
- Binomial inverse theorem
- Binomial identity
- Brahmagupta–Fibonacci two-square identity
- Candido's identity
- Cassini and Catalan identities
- Degen's eight-square identity
- Difference of two squares
- Euler's four-square identity
- Euler's identity
- Fibonacci's identity see Brahmagupta–Fibonacci identity or Cassini and Catalan identities
- Heine's identity
- Hermite's identity
- Lagrange's identity
- Lagrange's trigonometric identities
- List of logarithmic identities
- MacWilliams identity
- Matrix determinant lemma
- Newton's identity
- Parseval's identity
- Pfister's sixteen-square identity
- Sherman–Morrison formula
- Sophie Germain identity
- Sun's curious identity
- Sylvester's determinant identity
- Vandermonde's identity
- Woodbury matrix identity

== Identities for classes of functions ==
- Exterior calculus identities
- Fibonacci identities: Combinatorial Fibonacci identities and Other Fibonacci identities
- Hypergeometric function identities
- List of integrals of logarithmic functions
- List of topics related to π
- List of trigonometric identities
  - Inverse trigonometric functions
- Logarithmic identities
- Summation identities
- Vector calculus identities

== See also ==
- List of inequalities
- List of set identities and relations – Equalities for combinations of sets
