= List of things named after Jakob Bernoulli =

The following is a list of things named in Jakob Bernoulli's honour:

- Bernoulli's formula
- Bernoulli differential equation
- Bernoulli's inequality
- Bernoulli numbers
- Bernoulli polynomials
- Bernoulli's quadrisection problem
- Lemniscate of Bernoulli

== Probability ==
- Bernoulli distribution
  - Bernoulli process
  - Bernoulli scheme
  - Bernoulli trial
- Bernoulli map
- Bernoulli operator
- Bernoulli sampling
- Bernoulli random variable
- Bernoulli's Golden Theorem
- Hidden Bernoulli model
