= List of integrals of logarithmic functions =

The following is a list of integrals (antiderivative functions) of logarithmic functions. For a complete list of integral functions, see list of integrals.

Note: x > 0 is assumed throughout this article, and the constant of integration is omitted for simplicity.

== Integrals involving only logarithmic functions ==
$$\int\log_a x\,dx = x\log_a x - \frac{x}{\ln a} = \frac{x}{\ln a}(\ln x - 1)$$

$$\int\ln(ax)\,dx = x\ln(ax) - x = x(\ln(ax) - 1)$$

$$\int\ln (ax + b)\,dx = \frac{ax+b}{a}(\ln(ax+b) - 1)$$

$$\int (\ln x)^2\,dx = x(\ln x)^2 - 2x\ln x + 2x$$

$$\int{\ln^n{x}\,dx} = (-1)^n \, x \, \sum^n_{k=0} \frac{n!}{k!}(-\ln x)^k$$

$$\int \frac{dx}{\ln x} = \ln|\ln x| + \ln x + \sum^\infty_{k=2}\frac{(\ln x)^k}{k\cdot k!}$$

$\int \frac{dx}{\ln x} = \operatorname{li}(x)$, the logarithmic integral.

$$\int \frac{dx}{(\ln x)^n} = -\frac{x}{(n-1)(\ln x)^{n-1}} + \frac{1}{n-1}\int\frac{dx}{(\ln x)^{n-1}} \qquad\mbox{(for }n\neq 1\mbox{)}$$

$$\int \ln f(x)\,dx = x\ln f(x) - \int x\frac{f'(x)}{f(x)}\,dx \qquad\mbox{(for differentiable } f(x) > 0\mbox{)}$$

== Integrals involving logarithmic and power functions ==
$$\int x^m\ln x\,dx = x^{m+1}\left(\frac{\ln x}{m+1}-\frac{1}{(m+1)^2}\right) \qquad\mbox{(for }m\neq -1\mbox{)}$$

$$\int x^m (\ln x)^n\,dx = \frac{x^{m+1}(\ln x)^n}{m+1} - \frac{n}{m+1}\int x^m (\ln x)^{n-1} dx  \qquad\mbox{(for }m\neq -1\mbox{)}$$

$$\int \frac{(\ln x)^n\,dx}{x} = \frac{(\ln x)^{n+1}}{n+1}  \qquad\mbox{(for }n\neq -1\mbox{)}$$

$$\int \frac{\ln x\,dx}{x^m} = -\frac{\ln x}{(m-1)x^{m-1}}-\frac{1}{(m-1)^2 x^{m-1}} \qquad\mbox{(for }m\neq 1\mbox{)}$$

$$\int \frac{(\ln x)^n\,dx}{x^m} = -\frac{(\ln x)^n}{(m-1)x^{m-1}} + \frac{n}{m-1}\int\frac{(\ln x)^{n-1} dx}{x^m} \qquad\mbox{(for }m\neq 1\mbox{)}$$

$$\int \frac{x^m\,dx}{(\ln x)^n} = -\frac{x^{m+1}}{(n-1)(\ln x)^{n-1}} + \frac{m+1}{n-1}\int\frac{x^m dx}{(\ln x)^{n-1}}  \qquad\mbox{(for }n\neq 1\mbox{)}$$

$$\int \frac{dx}{x \ln x} = \ln \left|\ln x\right|$$

$\int \frac{dx}{x \ln x \ln \ln x} = \ln \left|\ln \left|\ln x\right| \right|$, etc.

$$\int \frac{dx}{x\ln \ln x} = \operatorname{li}(\ln x)$$

$$\int \frac{dx}{x^n\ln x} = \ln \left|\ln x\right| + \sum^\infty_{k=1} (-1)^k\frac{(n-1)^k(\ln x)^k}{k\cdot k!}$$

$$\int \frac{dx}{x(\ln x)^n} = -\frac{1}{(n-1)(\ln x)^{n-1}} \qquad\mbox{(for }n\neq 1\mbox{)}$$

$$\int \ln(x^2+a^2)\,dx = x\ln(x^2+a^2)-2x+2a\tan^{-1} \frac{x}{a}$$

$$\int \frac{x}{x^2+a^2}\ln(x^2+a^2)\,dx = \frac{1}{4} \ln^2(x^2+a^2)$$

== Integrals involving logarithmic and trigonometric functions ==
$$\int \sin (\ln x)\,dx = \frac{x}{2}(\sin (\ln x) - \cos (\ln x))$$

$$\int \cos (\ln x)\,dx = \frac{x}{2}(\sin (\ln x) + \cos (\ln x))$$

== Integrals involving logarithmic and exponential functions ==
$$\int e^x \left(x \ln x - x - \frac{1}{x}\right)\,dx = e^x (x \ln x - x - \ln x)$$

$$\int \frac{1}{e^x} \left( \frac{1}{x}-\ln x \right)\,dx = \frac{\ln x}{e^x}$$

$$\int e^x \left( \frac{1}{\ln x}- \frac{1}{x(\ln x)^2} \right)\,dx = \frac{e^x}{\ln x}$$

== n consecutive integrations ==
For $n$ consecutive integrations, the formula

$$\int\ln x\,dx = x(\ln x - 1) +C_{0}$$

generalizes to

$$\int\dotsi\int\ln x\,dx\dotsm dx    =   \frac{x^{n}}{n!}\left(\ln\,x-\sum_{k=1}^{n}\frac{1}{k}\right)+ \sum_{k=0}^{n-1} C_{k} \frac{x^{k}}{k!}$$,
where $C_{k}$ are arbitrary constants of integration.

== See also ==
- List of mathematical identities
- Lists of mathematics topics
