= List of vector spaces in mathematics =

This is a list of vector spaces in abstract mathematics, by Wikipedia page.

- Banach space
- Besov space
- Bochner space
- Dual space
- Euclidean space
- Fock space
- Fréchet space
- Hardy space
- Hilbert space
- Hölder space
- LF-space
- L^{p} space
- Minkowski space
- Montel space
- Morrey–Campanato space
- Orlicz space
- Riesz space
- Schwartz space
- Sobolev space
- Tsirelson space
