= Index of information theory articles =

This is a list of information theory topics.

- A Mathematical Theory of Communication
- algorithmic information theory
- arithmetic coding
- channel capacity
- Communication Theory of Secrecy Systems
- conditional entropy
- conditional quantum entropy
- confusion and diffusion
- cross-entropy
- data compression
- entropic uncertainty (Hirchman uncertainty)
- entropy encoding
- entropy (information theory)
- Fisher information
- Hick's law
- Huffman coding
- information bottleneck method
- information theoretic security
- information theory
- joint entropy
- Kullback–Leibler divergence
- lossless compression
- negentropy
- noisy-channel coding theorem (Shannon's theorem)
- principle of maximum entropy
- quantum information science
- range encoding
- redundancy (information theory)
- Rényi entropy
- self-information
- Shannon–Hartley theorem
