= Table of Clebsch–Gordan coefficients =

This is a table of Clebsch–Gordan coefficients used for adding angular momentum values in quantum mechanics. The overall sign of the coefficients for each set of constant $j_1$, $j_2$, $j$ is arbitrary to some degree and has been fixed according to the Condon–Shortley and Wigner sign convention as discussed by Baird and Biedenharn. Tables with the same sign convention may be found in the Particle Data Group's Review of Particle Properties and in online tables.

== Formulation ==
The Clebsch–Gordan coefficients are the solutions to

$$|j_1,j_2;j,m\rangle = \sum_{m_1=-j_1}^{j_1} \sum_{m_2=-j_2}^{j_2}
|j_1,m_1;j_2,m_2\rangle \langle j_1,j_2;m_1,m_2\mid j_1,j_2;j,m\rangle$$

Explicitly:

$$\begin{align}
& \langle j_1,j_2;m_1,m_2\mid j_1,j_2;j,m\rangle \\[6pt]
= {} & \delta_{m,m_1+m_2} \sqrt{\frac{(2j+1)(j+j_1-j_2)!\,(j-j_1+j_2)!\,(j_1+j_2-j)!}{(j_1+j_2+j+1)!}}\ \times {} \\[6pt]
&\sqrt{(j+m)!\,(j-m)!\,(j_1-m_1)!\,(j_1+m_1)!\,(j_2-m_2)!\,(j_2+m_2)!}\ \times {} \\[6pt]
&\sum_k \frac{(-1)^k}{k!\,(j_1+j_2-j-k)!\,(j_1-m_1-k)!\,(j_2+m_2-k)!\,(j-j_2+m_1+k)!\,(j-j_1-m_2+k)!}.
\end{align}$$

The summation is extended over all integer k for which the argument of every factorial is nonnegative.

For brevity, solutions with m < 0 and j_{1} < j_{2} are omitted. They may be calculated using the simple relations

$$\langle j_1,j_2;m_1,m_2\mid j_1,j_2;j,m\rangle=(-1)^{j-j_1-j_2}\langle j_1,j_2;-m_1,-m_2\mid j_1,j_2;j,-m\rangle.$$

and

$$\langle j_1,j_2;m_1,m_2\mid j_1,j_2;j,m\rangle=(-1)^{j-j_1-j_2} \langle j_2,j_1;m_2,m_1\mid j_2, j_1;j,m\rangle.$$

== Specific values ==
The Clebsch–Gordan coefficients for j values less than or equal to 5/2 are given below.

=== j_{2} = 0 ===
When j_{2} = 0, the Clebsch–Gordan coefficients are given by $\delta_{j,j_1}\delta_{m,m_1}$.

=== j_{1} = 1/2, j_{2} = 1/2 ===
m = 1
j m_{1}, m_{2}	1
1/2, 1/2	$1$

m = −1
j m_{1}, m_{2}	1
−1/2, −1/2	$1$

m = 0
j m_{1}, m_{2}	1	0
1/2, −1/2	$\sqrt{\frac{1}{2}}$	$\sqrt{\frac{1}{2}}$
−1/2, 1/2	$\sqrt{\frac{1}{2}}$	$-\sqrt{\frac{1}{2}}$

=== j_{1} = 1, j_{2} = 1/2 ===
m = 3/2
j m_{1}, m_{2}	3/2
1, 1/2	$1$

m = 1/2
j m_{1}, m_{2}	3/2	1/2
1, −1/2	$\sqrt{\frac{1}{3}}$	$\sqrt{\frac{2}{3}}$
0, 1/2	$\sqrt{\frac{2}{3}}$	$-\sqrt{\frac{1}{3}}$

=== j_{1} = 1, j_{2} = 1 ===
m = 2
j m_{1}, m_{2}	2
1, 1	$1$

m = 1
j m_{1}, m_{2}	2	1
1, 0	$\sqrt{\frac{1}{2}}$	$\sqrt{\frac{1}{2}}$
0, 1	$\sqrt{\frac{1}{2}}$	$-\sqrt{\frac{1}{2}}$

m = 0
j m_{1}, m_{2}	2	1	0
1, −1	$\sqrt{\frac{1}{6}}$	$\sqrt{\frac{1}{2}}$	$\sqrt{\frac{1}{3}}$
0, 0	$\sqrt{\frac{2}{3}}$	$0$	$-\sqrt{\frac{1}{3}}$
−1, 1	$\sqrt{\frac{1}{6}}$	$-\sqrt{\frac{1}{2}}$	$\sqrt{\frac{1}{3}}$

=== j_{1} = 3/2, j_{2} = 1/2 ===
m = 2
j m_{1}, m_{2}	2
3/2, 1/2	$1$

m = 1
j m_{1}, m_{2}	2	1
3/2, −1/2	$\frac{1}{2}$	$\sqrt{\frac{3}{4}}$
1/2, 1/2	$\sqrt{\frac{3}{4}}$	$-\frac{1}{2}$

m = 0
j m_{1}, m_{2}	2	1
1/2, −1/2	$\sqrt{\frac{1}{2}}$	$\sqrt{\frac{1}{2}}$
−1/2, 1/2	$\sqrt{\frac{1}{2}}$	$-\sqrt{\frac{1}{2}}$

=== j_{1} = 3/2, j_{2} = 1 ===
m = 5/2
j m_{1}, m_{2}	5/2
3/2, 1	$1$

m = 3/2
j m_{1}, m_{2}	5/2	3/2
3/2, 0	$\sqrt{\frac{2}{5}}$	$\sqrt{\frac{3}{5}}$
1/2, 1	$\sqrt{\frac{3}{5}}$	$-\sqrt{\frac{2}{5}}$

m = 1/2
j m_{1}, m_{2}	5/2	3/2	1/2
3/2, −1	$\sqrt{\frac{1}{10}}$	$\sqrt{\frac{2}{5}}$	$\sqrt{\frac{1}{2}}$
1/2, 0	$\sqrt{\frac{3}{5}}$	$\sqrt{\frac{1}{15}}$	$-\sqrt{\frac{1}{3}}$
−1/2, 1	$\sqrt{\frac{3}{10}}$	$-\sqrt{\frac{8}{15}}$	$\sqrt{\frac{1}{6}}$

=== j_{1} = 3/2, j_{2} = 3/2 ===
m = 3
j m_{1}, m_{2}	3
3/2, 3/2	$1$

m = 2
j m_{1}, m_{2}	3	2
3/2, 1/2	$\sqrt{\frac{1}{2}}$	$\sqrt{\frac{1}{2}}$
1/2, 3/2	$\sqrt{\frac{1}{2}}$	$-\sqrt{\frac{1}{2}}$

m = 1
j m_{1}, m_{2}	3	2	1
3/2, −1/2	$\sqrt{\frac{1}{5}}$	$\sqrt{\frac{1}{2}}$	$\sqrt{\frac{3}{10}}$
1/2, 1/2	$\sqrt{\frac{3}{5}}$	$0$	$-\sqrt{\frac{2}{5}}$
−1/2, 3/2	$\sqrt{\frac{1}{5}}$	$-\sqrt{\frac{1}{2}}$	$\sqrt{\frac{3}{10}}$

m = 0
j m_{1}, m_{2}	3	2	1	0
3/2, −3/2	$\sqrt{\frac{1}{20}}$	$\frac{1}{2}$	$\sqrt{\frac{9}{20}}$	$\frac{1}{2}$
1/2, −1/2	$\sqrt{\frac{9}{20}}$	$\frac{1}{2}$	$-\sqrt{\frac{1}{20}}$	$-\frac{1}{2}$
−1/2, 1/2	$\sqrt{\frac{9}{20}}$	$-\frac{1}{2}$	$-\sqrt{\frac{1}{20}}$	$\frac{1}{2}$
−3/2, 3/2	$\sqrt{\frac{1}{20}}$	$-\frac{1}{2}$	$\sqrt{\frac{9}{20}}$	$-\frac{1}{2}$

=== j_{1} = 2, j_{2} = 1/2 ===
m = 5/2
j m_{1}, m_{2}	5/2
2, 1/2	$1$

m = 3/2
j m_{1}, m_{2}	5/2	3/2
2, −1/2	$\sqrt{\frac{1}{5}}$	$\sqrt{\frac{4}{5}}$
1, 1/2	$\sqrt{\frac{4}{5}}$	$-\sqrt{\frac{1}{5}}$

m = 1/2
j m_{1}, m_{2}	5/2	3/2
1, −1/2	$\sqrt{\frac{2}{5}}$	$\sqrt{\frac{3}{5}}$
0, 1/2	$\sqrt{\frac{3}{5}}$	$-\sqrt{\frac{2}{5}}$

=== j_{1} = 2, j_{2} = 1 ===
m = 3
j m_{1}, m_{2}	3
2, 1	$1$

m = 2
j m_{1}, m_{2}	3	2
2, 0	$\sqrt{\frac{1}{3}}$	$\sqrt{\frac{2}{3}}$
1, 1	$\sqrt{\frac{2}{3}}$	$-\sqrt{\frac{1}{3}}$

m = 1
j m_{1}, m_{2}	3	2	1
2, −1	$\sqrt{\frac{1}{15}}$	$\sqrt{\frac{1}{3}}$	$\sqrt{\frac{3}{5}}$
1, 0	$\sqrt{\frac{8}{15}}$	$\sqrt{\frac{1}{6}}$	$-\sqrt{\frac{3}{10}}$
0, 1	$\sqrt{\frac{2}{5}}$	$-\sqrt{\frac{1}{2}}$	$\sqrt{\frac{1}{10}}$

m = 0
j m_{1}, m_{2}	3	2	1
1, −1	$\sqrt{\frac{1}{5}}$	$\sqrt{\frac{1}{2}}$	$\sqrt{\frac{3}{10}}$
0, 0	$\sqrt{\frac{3}{5}}$	$0$	$-\sqrt{\frac{2}{5}}$
−1, 1	$\sqrt{\frac{1}{5}}$	$-\sqrt{\frac{1}{2}}$	$\sqrt{\frac{3}{10}}$

=== j_{1} = 2, j_{2} = 3/2 ===
m = 7/2
j m_{1}, m_{2}	7/2
2, 3/2	$1$

m = 5/2
j m_{1}, m_{2}	7/2	5/2
2, 1/2	$\sqrt{\frac{3}{7}}$	$\sqrt{\frac{4}{7}}$
1, 3/2	$\sqrt{\frac{4}{7}}$	$-\sqrt{\frac{3}{7}}$

m = 3/2
j m_{1}, m_{2}	7/2	5/2	3/2
2, −1/2	$\sqrt{\frac{1}{7}}$	$\sqrt{\frac{16}{35}}$	$\sqrt{\frac{2}{5}}$
1, 1/2	$\sqrt{\frac{4}{7}}$	$\sqrt{\frac{1}{35}}$	$-\sqrt{\frac{2}{5}}$
0, 3/2	$\sqrt{\frac{2}{7}}$	$-\sqrt{\frac{18}{35}}$	$\sqrt{\frac{1}{5}}$

m = 1/2
j m_{1}, m_{2}	7/2	5/2	3/2	1/2
2, −3/2	$\sqrt{\frac{1}{35}}$	$\sqrt{\frac{6}{35}}$	$\sqrt{\frac{2}{5}}$	$\sqrt{\frac{2}{5}}$
1, −1/2	$\sqrt{\frac{12}{35}}$	$\sqrt{\frac{5}{14}}$	$0$	$-\sqrt{\frac{3}{10}}$
0, 1/2	$\sqrt{\frac{18}{35}}$	$-\sqrt{\frac{3}{35}}$	$-\sqrt{\frac{1}{5}}$	$\sqrt{\frac{1}{5}}$
−1, 3/2	$\sqrt{\frac{4}{35}}$	$-\sqrt{\frac{27}{70}}$	$\sqrt{\frac{2}{5}}$	$-\sqrt{\frac{1}{10}}$

=== j_{1} = 2, j_{2} = 2 ===
m = 4
j m_{1}, m_{2}	4
2, 2	$1$

m = 3
j m_{1}, m_{2}	4	3
2, 1	$\sqrt{\frac{1}{2}}$	$\sqrt{\frac{1}{2}}$
1, 2	$\sqrt{\frac{1}{2}}$	$-\sqrt{\frac{1}{2}}$

m = 2
j m_{1}, m_{2}	4	3	2
2, 0	$\sqrt{\frac{3}{14}}$	$\sqrt{\frac{1}{2}}$	$\sqrt{\frac{2}{7}}$
1, 1	$\sqrt{\frac{4}{7}}$	$0$	$-\sqrt{\frac{3}{7}}$
0, 2	$\sqrt{\frac{3}{14}}$	$-\sqrt{\frac{1}{2}}$	$\sqrt{\frac{2}{7}}$

m = 1
j m_{1}, m_{2}	4	3	2	1
2, −1	$\sqrt{\frac{1}{14}}$	$\sqrt{\frac{3}{10}}$	$\sqrt{\frac{3}{7}}$	$\sqrt{\frac{1}{5}}$
1, 0	$\sqrt{\frac{3}{7}}$	$\sqrt{\frac{1}{5}}$	$-\sqrt{\frac{1}{14}}$	$-\sqrt{\frac{3}{10}}$
0, 1	$\sqrt{\frac{3}{7}}$	$-\sqrt{\frac{1}{5}}$	$-\sqrt{\frac{1}{14}}$	$\sqrt{\frac{3}{10}}$
−1, 2	$\sqrt{\frac{1}{14}}$	$-\sqrt{\frac{3}{10}}$	$\sqrt{\frac{3}{7}}$	$-\sqrt{\frac{1}{5}}$

m = 0
j m_{1}, m_{2}	4	3	2	1	0
2, −2	$\sqrt{\frac{1}{70}}$	$\sqrt{\frac{1}{10}}$	$\sqrt{\frac{2}{7}}$	$\sqrt{\frac{2}{5}}$	$\sqrt{\frac{1}{5}}$
1, −1	$\sqrt{\frac{8}{35}}$	$\sqrt{\frac{2}{5}}$	$\sqrt{\frac{1}{14}}$	$-\sqrt{\frac{1}{10}}$	$-\sqrt{\frac{1}{5}}$
0, 0	$\sqrt{\frac{18}{35}}$	$0$	$-\sqrt{\frac{2}{7}}$	$0$	$\sqrt{\frac{1}{5}}$
−1, 1	$\sqrt{\frac{8}{35}}$	$-\sqrt{\frac{2}{5}}$	$\sqrt{\frac{1}{14}}$	$\sqrt{\frac{1}{10}}$	$-\sqrt{\frac{1}{5}}$
−2, 2	$\sqrt{\frac{1}{70}}$	$-\sqrt{\frac{1}{10}}$	$\sqrt{\frac{2}{7}}$	$-\sqrt{\frac{2}{5}}$	$\sqrt{\frac{1}{5}}$

=== j_{1} = 5/2, j_{2} = 1/2 ===
m = 3
j m_{1}, m_{2}	3
5/2, 1/2	$1$

m = 2
j m_{1}, m_{2}	3	2
5/2, −1/2	$\sqrt{\frac{1}{6}}$	$\sqrt{\frac{5}{6}}$
3/2, 1/2	$\sqrt{\frac{5}{6}}$	$-\sqrt{\frac{1}{6}}$

m = 1
j m_{1}, m_{2}	3	2
3/2, −1/2	$\sqrt{\frac{1}{3}}$	$\sqrt{\frac{2}{3}}$
1/2, 1/2	$\sqrt{\frac{2}{3}}$	$-\sqrt{\frac{1}{3}}$

m = 0
j m_{1}, m_{2}	3	2
1/2, −1/2	$\sqrt{\frac{1}{2}}$	$\sqrt{\frac{1}{2}}$
−1/2, 1/2	$\sqrt{\frac{1}{2}}$	$-\sqrt{\frac{1}{2}}$

=== j_{1} = 5/2, j_{2} = 1 ===
m = 7/2
j m_{1}, m_{2}	7/2
5/2, 1	$1$

m = 5/2
j m_{1}, m_{2}	7/2	5/2
5/2, 0	$\sqrt{\frac{2}{7}}$	$\sqrt{\frac{5}{7}}$
3/2, 1	$\sqrt{\frac{5}{7}}$	$-\sqrt{\frac{2}{7}}$

m = 3/2
j m_{1}, m_{2}	7/2	5/2	3/2
5/2, −1	$\sqrt{\frac{1}{21}}$	$\sqrt{\frac{2}{7}}$	$\sqrt{\frac{2}{3}}$
3/2, 0	$\sqrt{\frac{10}{21}}$	$\sqrt{\frac{9}{35}}$	$-\sqrt{\frac{4}{15}}$
1/2, 1	$\sqrt{\frac{10}{21}}$	$-\sqrt{\frac{16}{35}}$	$\sqrt{\frac{1}{15}}$

m = 1/2
j m_{1}, m_{2}	7/2	5/2	3/2
3/2, −1	$\sqrt{\frac{1}{7}}$	$\sqrt{\frac{16}{35}}$	$\sqrt{\frac{2}{5}}$
1/2, 0	$\sqrt{\frac{4}{7}}$	$\sqrt{\frac{1}{35}}$	$-\sqrt{\frac{2}{5}}$
−1/2, 1	$\sqrt{\frac{2}{7}}$	$-\sqrt{\frac{18}{35}}$	$\sqrt{\frac{1}{5}}$

=== j_{1} = 5/2, j_{2} = 3/2 ===
m = 4
j m_{1}, m_{2}	4
5/2, 3/2	$1$

m = 3
j m_{1}, m_{2}	4	3
5/2, 1/2	$\sqrt{\frac{3}{8}}$	$\sqrt{\frac{5}{8}}$
3/2, 3/2	$\sqrt{\frac{5}{8}}$	$-\sqrt{\frac{3}{8}}$

m = 2
j m_{1}, m_{2}	4	3	2
5/2, −1/2	$\sqrt{\frac{3}{28}}$	$\sqrt{\frac{5}{12}}$	$\sqrt{\frac{10}{21}}$
3/2, 1/2	$\sqrt{\frac{15}{28}}$	$\sqrt{\frac{1}{12}}$	$-\sqrt{\frac{8}{21}}$
1/2, 3/2	$\sqrt{\frac{5}{14}}$	$-\sqrt{\frac{1}{2}}$	$\sqrt{\frac{1}{7}}$

m = 1
j m_{1}, m_{2}	4	3	2	1
5/2, −3/2	$\sqrt{\frac{1}{56}}$	$\sqrt{\frac{1}{8}}$	$\sqrt{\frac{5}{14}}$	$\sqrt{\frac{1}{2}}$
3/2, −1/2	$\sqrt{\frac{15}{56}}$	$\sqrt{\frac{49}{120}}$	$\sqrt{\frac{1}{42}}$	$-\sqrt{\frac{3}{10}}$
1/2, 1/2	$\sqrt{\frac{15}{28}}$	$-\sqrt{\frac{1}{60}}$	$-\sqrt{\frac{25}{84}}$	$\sqrt{\frac{3}{20}}$
−1/2, 3/2	$\sqrt{\frac{5}{28}}$	$-\sqrt{\frac{9}{20}}$	$\sqrt{\frac{9}{28}}$	$-\sqrt{\frac{1}{20}}$

m = 0
j m_{1}, m_{2}	4	3	2	1
3/2, −3/2	$\sqrt{\frac{1}{14}}$	$\sqrt{\frac{3}{10}}$	$\sqrt{\frac{3}{7}}$	$\sqrt{\frac{1}{5}}$
1/2, −1/2	$\sqrt{\frac{3}{7}}$	$\sqrt{\frac{1}{5}}$	$-\sqrt{\frac{1}{14}}$	$-\sqrt{\frac{3}{10}}$
−1/2, 1/2	$\sqrt{\frac{3}{7}}$	$-\sqrt{\frac{1}{5}}$	$-\sqrt{\frac{1}{14}}$	$\sqrt{\frac{3}{10}}$
−3/2, 3/2	$\sqrt{\frac{1}{14}}$	$-\sqrt{\frac{3}{10}}$	$\sqrt{\frac{3}{7}}$	$-\sqrt{\frac{1}{5}}$

=== j_{1} = 5/2, j_{2} = 2 ===
m = 9/2
j m_{1}, m_{2}	9/2
5/2, 2	$1$

m = 7/2
j m_{1}, m_{2}	9/2	7/2
5/2, 1	$\frac{2}{3}$	$\sqrt{\frac{5}{9}}$
3/2, 2	$\sqrt{\frac{5}{9}}$	$-\frac{2}{3}$

m = 5/2
j m_{1}, m_{2}	9/2	7/2	5/2
5/2, 0	$\sqrt{\frac{1}{6}}$	$\sqrt{\frac{10}{21}}$	$\sqrt{\frac{5}{14}}$
3/2, 1	$\sqrt{\frac{5}{9}}$	$\sqrt{\frac{1}{63}}$	$-\sqrt{\frac{3}{7}}$
1/2, 2	$\sqrt{\frac{5}{18}}$	$-\sqrt{\frac{32}{63}}$	$\sqrt{\frac{3}{14}}$

m = 3/2
j m_{1}, m_{2}	9/2	7/2	5/2	3/2
5/2, −1	$\sqrt{\frac{1}{21}}$	$\sqrt{\frac{5}{21}}$	$\sqrt{\frac{3}{7}}$	$\sqrt{\frac{2}{7}}$
3/2, 0	$\sqrt{\frac{5}{14}}$	$\sqrt{\frac{2}{7}}$	$-\sqrt{\frac{1}{70}}$	$-\sqrt{\frac{12}{35}}$
1/2, 1	$\sqrt{\frac{10}{21}}$	$-\sqrt{\frac{2}{21}}$	$-\sqrt{\frac{6}{35}}$	$\sqrt{\frac{9}{35}}$
−1/2, 2	$\sqrt{\frac{5}{42}}$	$-\sqrt{\frac{8}{21}}$	$\sqrt{\frac{27}{70}}$	$-\sqrt{\frac{4}{35}}$

m = 1/2
j m_{1}, m_{2}	9/2	7/2	5/2	3/2	1/2
5/2, −2	$\sqrt{\frac{1}{126}}$	$\sqrt{\frac{4}{63}}$	$\sqrt{\frac{3}{14}}$	$\sqrt{\frac{8}{21}}$	$\sqrt{\frac{1}{3}}$
3/2, −1	$\sqrt{\frac{10}{63}}$	$\sqrt{\frac{121}{315}}$	$\sqrt{\frac{6}{35}}$	$-\sqrt{\frac{2}{105}}$	$-\sqrt{\frac{4}{15}}$
1/2, 0	$\sqrt{\frac{10}{21}}$	$\sqrt{\frac{4}{105}}$	$-\sqrt{\frac{8}{35}}$	$-\sqrt{\frac{2}{35}}$	$\sqrt{\frac{1}{5}}$
−1/2, 1	$\sqrt{\frac{20}{63}}$	$-\sqrt{\frac{14}{45}}$	$0$	$\sqrt{\frac{5}{21}}$	$-\sqrt{\frac{2}{15}}$
−3/2, 2	$\sqrt{\frac{5}{126}}$	$-\sqrt{\frac{64}{315}}$	$\sqrt{\frac{27}{70}}$	$-\sqrt{\frac{32}{105}}$	$\sqrt{\frac{1}{15}}$

=== j_{1} = 5/2, j_{2} = 5/2 ===
m = 5
j m_{1}, m_{2}	5
5/2, 5/2	$1$

m = 4
j m_{1}, m_{2}	5	4
5/2, 3/2	$\sqrt{\frac{1}{2}}$	$\sqrt{\frac{1}{2}}$
3/2, 5/2	$\sqrt{\frac{1}{2}}$	$-\sqrt{\frac{1}{2}}$

m = 3
j m_{1}, m_{2}	5	4	3
5/2, 1/2	$\sqrt{\frac{2}{9}}$	$\sqrt{\frac{1}{2}}$	$\sqrt{\frac{5}{18}}$
3/2, 3/2	$\sqrt{\frac{5}{9}}$	$0$	$-{\frac{2}{3}}$
1/2, 5/2	$\sqrt{\frac{2}{9}}$	$-\sqrt{\frac{1}{2}}$	$\sqrt{\frac{5}{18}}$

m = 2
j m_{1}, m_{2}	5	4	3	2
5/2, −1/2	$\sqrt{\frac{1}{12}}$	$\sqrt{\frac{9}{28}}$	$\sqrt{\frac{5}{12}}$	$\sqrt{\frac{5}{28}}$
3/2, 1/2	$\sqrt{\frac{5}{12}}$	$\sqrt{\frac{5}{28}}$	$-\sqrt{\frac{1}{12}}$	$-\sqrt{\frac{9}{28}}$
1/2, 3/2	$\sqrt{\frac{5}{12}}$	$-\sqrt{\frac{5}{28}}$	$-\sqrt{\frac{1}{12}}$	$\sqrt{\frac{9}{28}}$
−1/2, 5/2	$\sqrt{\frac{1}{12}}$	$-\sqrt{\frac{9}{28}}$	$\sqrt{\frac{5}{12}}$	$-\sqrt{\frac{5}{28}}$

m = 1
j m_{1}, m_{2}	5	4	3	2	1
5/2, −3/2	$\sqrt{\frac{1}{42}}$	$\sqrt{\frac{1}{7}}$	$\sqrt{\frac{1}{3}}$	$\sqrt{\frac{5}{14}}$	$\sqrt{\frac{1}{7}}$
3/2, −1/2	$\sqrt{\frac{5}{21}}$	$\sqrt{\frac{5}{14}}$	$\sqrt{\frac{1}{30}}$	$-\sqrt{\frac{1}{7}}$	$-\sqrt{\frac{8}{35}}$
1/2, 1/2	$\sqrt{\frac{10}{21}}$	$0$	$-\sqrt{\frac{4}{15}}$	$0$	$\sqrt{\frac{9}{35}}$
−1/2, 3/2	$\sqrt{\frac{5}{21}}$	$-\sqrt{\frac{5}{14}}$	$\sqrt{\frac{1}{30}}$	$\sqrt{\frac{1}{7}}$	$-\sqrt{\frac{8}{35}}$
−3/2, 5/2	$\sqrt{\frac{1}{42}}$	$-\sqrt{\frac{1}{7}}$	$\sqrt{\frac{1}{3}}$	$-\sqrt{\frac{5}{14}}$	$\sqrt{\frac{1}{7}}$

m = 0
j m_{1}, m_{2}	5	4	3	2	1	0
5/2, −5/2	$\sqrt{\frac{1}{252}}$	$\sqrt{\frac{1}{28}}$	$\sqrt{\frac{5}{36}}$	$\sqrt{\frac{25}{84}}$	$\sqrt{\frac{5}{14}}$	$\sqrt{\frac{1}{6}}$
3/2, −3/2	$\sqrt{\frac{25}{252}}$	$\sqrt{\frac{9}{28}}$	$\sqrt{\frac{49}{180}}$	$\sqrt{\frac{1}{84}}$	$-\sqrt{\frac{9}{70}}$	$-\sqrt{\frac{1}{6}}$
1/2, −1/2	$\sqrt{\frac{25}{63}}$	$\sqrt{\frac{1}{7}}$	$-\sqrt{\frac{4}{45}}$	$-\sqrt{\frac{4}{21}}$	$\sqrt{\frac{1}{70}}$	$\sqrt{\frac{1}{6}}$
−1/2, 1/2	$\sqrt{\frac{25}{63}}$	$-\sqrt{\frac{1}{7}}$	$-\sqrt{\frac{4}{45}}$	$\sqrt{\frac{4}{21}}$	$\sqrt{\frac{1}{70}}$	$-\sqrt{\frac{1}{6}}$
−3/2, 3/2	$\sqrt{\frac{25}{252}}$	$-\sqrt{\frac{9}{28}}$	$\sqrt{\frac{49}{180}}$	$-\sqrt{\frac{1}{84}}$	$-\sqrt{\frac{9}{70}}$	$\sqrt{\frac{1}{6}}$
−5/2, 5/2	$\sqrt{\frac{1}{252}}$	$-\sqrt{\frac{1}{28}}$	$\sqrt{\frac{5}{36}}$	$-\sqrt{\frac{25}{84}}$	$\sqrt{\frac{5}{14}}$	$-\sqrt{\frac{1}{6}}$

== SU(N) Clebsch–Gordan coefficients ==
Algorithms to produce Clebsch–Gordan coefficients for higher values of $j_1$ and $j_2$, or for the su(N) algebra instead of su(2), are known. A web interface for tabulating SU(N) Clebsch–Gordan coefficients is readily available.
