= Outline of vector identities =

There are two lists of mathematical identities related to vectors:

- Vector algebra relations — regarding operations on individual vectors such as dot product, cross product, etc.
- Vector calculus identities — regarding operations on vector fields such as divergence, gradient, curl, etc.
