= Illustration of the central limit theorem =

In probability theory, the central limit theorem (CLT) states that, in many situations, when independent and identically distributed random variables are added, their properly normalized sum tends toward a normal distribution. This article gives two illustrations of this theorem. Both involve the sum of independent and identically-distributed random variables and show how the probability distribution of the sum approaches the normal distribution as the number of terms in the sum increases.

The first illustration involves a continuous probability distribution, for which the random variables have a probability density function. The second illustration, for which most of the computation can be done by hand, involves a discrete probability distribution, which is characterized by a probability mass function.

== Illustration of the continuous case ==
The density of the sum of two independent real-valued random variables equals the convolution of the density functions of the original variables.

Thus, the density of the sum of m+n terms of a sequence of independent identically distributed variables equals the convolution of the densities of the sums of m terms and of n term. In particular, the density of the sum of n+1 terms equals the convolution of the density of the sum of n terms with the original density (the "sum" of 1 term).

A probability density function is shown in the first figure below. Then the densities of the sums of two, three, and four independent identically distributed variables, each having the original density, are shown in the following figures. If the original density is a piecewise polynomial, as it is in the example, then so are the sum densities, of increasingly higher degree. Although the original density is far from normal, the density of the sum of just a few variables with that density is much smoother and has some of the qualitative features of the normal density.

The convolutions were computed via the discrete Fourier transform. A list of values y = f(x_{0} + k Δx) was constructed, where f is the original density function, and Δx is approximately equal to 0.002, and k is equal to 0 through 1000. The discrete Fourier transform Y of y was computed. Then the convolution of f with itself is proportional to the inverse discrete Fourier transform of the pointwise product of Y with itself.

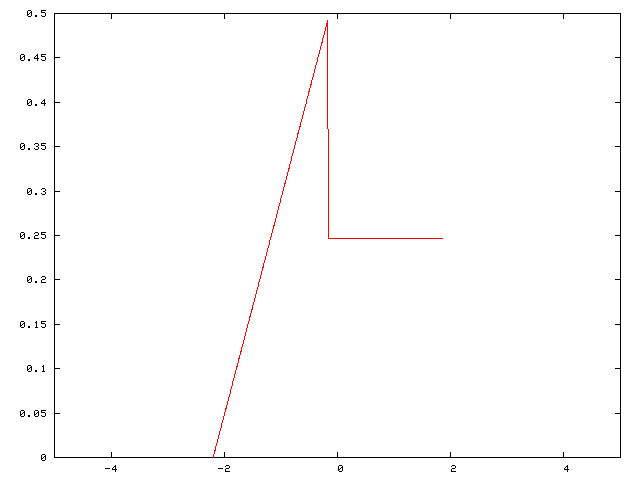
A probability density function.

=== Original probability density function ===
We start with a probability density function. This function, although discontinuous, is far from the most pathological example that could be created. It is a piecewise polynomial, with pieces of degrees 0 and 1. The mean of this distribution is 0 and its standard deviation is 1.

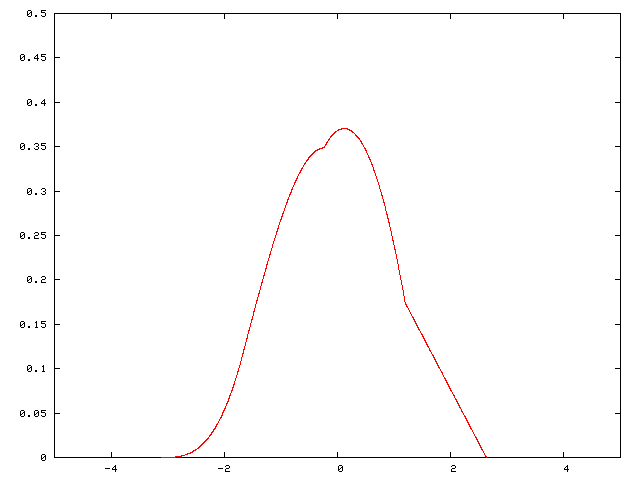
Density of a sum of two variables.

=== Probability density function of the sum of two terms ===
Next we compute the density of the sum of two independent variables, each having the above density. The density of the sum is the convolution of the above density with itself.

The sum of two variables has mean 0. The density shown in the figure at right has been rescaled by $\sqrt{2}$, so that its standard deviation is 1.

This density is already smoother than the original. There are obvious lumps, which correspond to the intervals on which the original density was defined.

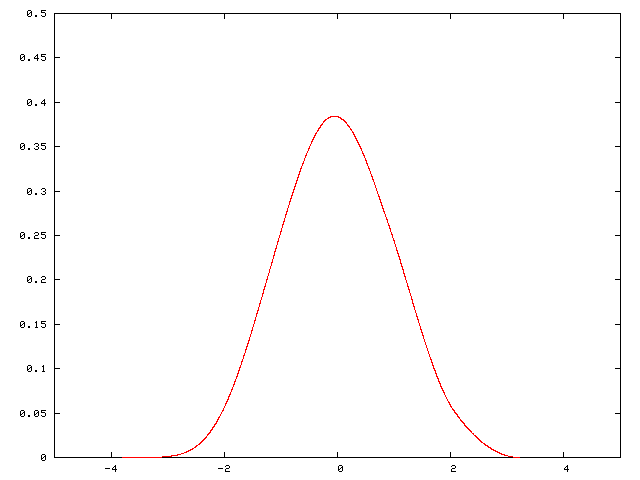
Density of a sum of three variables.

=== Probability density function of the sum of three terms ===
We then compute the density of the sum of three independent variables, each having the above density. The density of the sum is the convolution of the first density with the second.

The sum of three variables has mean 0. The density shown in the figure at right has been rescaled by √3, so that its standard deviation is 1.

This density is even smoother than the preceding one. The lumps can hardly be detected in this figure.

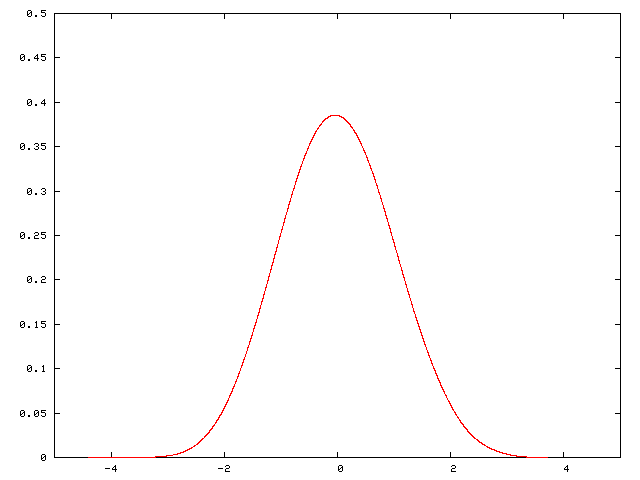
Density of a sum of four variables

=== Probability density function of the sum of four terms ===
Finally, we compute the density of the sum of four independent variables, each having the above density. The density of the sum is the convolution of the first density with the third (or the second density with itself).

The sum of four variables has mean 0. The density shown in the figure at right has been rescaled by √4, so that its standard deviation is 1.

This density appears qualitatively very similar to a normal density. No lumps can be distinguished by the eye.

== Illustration of the discrete case ==
This section illustrates the central limit theorem via an example for which the computation can be done quickly by hand on paper, unlike the more computing-intensive example of the previous section.

Sum of all permutations of length 1 selected from the set of integers 1, 2, 3

=== Original probability mass function ===
Suppose the probability distribution of a discrete random variable X puts equal weights on 1, 2, and 3:

$$X=\left\{\begin{matrix} 1 & \mbox{with}\ \mbox{probability}\ 1/3, \\
2 & \mbox{with}\ \mbox{probability}\ 1/3, \\
3 & \mbox{with}\ \mbox{probability}\ 1/3.
\end{matrix}\right.$$

The probability mass function of the random variable X may be depicted by the following bar graph:

Clearly this looks nothing like the bell-shaped curve of the normal distribution. Contrast the above with the depictions below.

Sum of all permutations of length 2 selected from the set of integers 1, 2, 3

=== Probability mass function of the sum of two terms ===
Now consider the sum of two independent copies of X:

$$\left\{\begin{matrix}
1+1 & = & 2 \\
1+2 & = & 3 \\
1+3 & = & 4 \\
2+1 & = & 3 \\
2+2 & = & 4 \\
2+3 & = & 5 \\
3+1 & = & 4 \\
3+2 & = & 5 \\
3+3 & = & 6
\end{matrix}\right\}
=\left\{\begin{matrix}
2 & \mbox{with}\ \mbox{probability}\ 1/9 \\
3 & \mbox{with}\ \mbox{probability}\ 2/9 \\
4 & \mbox{with}\ \mbox{probability}\ 3/9 \\
5 & \mbox{with}\ \mbox{probability}\ 2/9 \\
6 & \mbox{with}\ \mbox{probability}\ 1/9
\end{matrix}\right\}$$

The probability mass function of this sum may be depicted thus:

This still does not look very much like the bell-shaped curve, but, like the bell-shaped curve and unlike the probability mass function of X itself, it is higher in the middle than in the two tails.

Sum of all permutations of length 3 selected from the set of integers 1, 2, 3

=== Probability mass function of the sum of three terms ===
Now consider the sum of three independent copies of this random variable:

$$\left\{\begin{matrix}
1+1+1 & = & 3 \\
1+1+2 & = & 4 \\
1+1+3 & = & 5 \\
1+2+1 & = & 4 \\
1+2+2 & = & 5 \\
1+2+3 & = & 6 \\
1+3+1 & = & 5 \\
1+3+2 & = & 6 \\
1+3+3 & = & 7 \\
2+1+1 & = & 4 \\
2+1+2 & = & 5 \\
2+1+3 & = & 6 \\
2+2+1 & = & 5 \\
2+2+2 & = & 6 \\
2+2+3 & = & 7 \\
2+3+1 & = & 6 \\
2+3+2 & = & 7 \\
2+3+3 & = & 8 \\
3+1+1 & = & 5 \\
3+1+2 & = & 6 \\
3+1+3 & = & 7 \\
3+2+1 & = & 6 \\
3+2+2 & = & 7 \\
3+2+3 & = & 8 \\
3+3+1 & = & 7 \\
3+3+2 & = & 8 \\
3+3+3 & = & 9
\end{matrix}\right\}
=\left\{\begin{matrix}
3 & \mbox{with}\ \mbox{probability}\ 1/27 \\
4 & \mbox{with}\ \mbox{probability}\ 3/27 \\
5 & \mbox{with}\ \mbox{probability}\ 6/27 \\
6 & \mbox{with}\ \mbox{probability}\ 7/27 \\
7 & \mbox{with}\ \mbox{probability}\ 6/27 \\
8 & \mbox{with}\ \mbox{probability}\ 3/27 \\
9 & \mbox{with}\ \mbox{probability}\ 1/27
\end{matrix}\right\}$$

The probability mass function of this sum may be depicted thus:

Not only is this bigger at the center than it is at the tails, but as one moves toward the center from either tail, the slope first increases and then decreases, just as with the bell-shaped curve.

The degree of its resemblance to the bell-shaped curve can be quantified as follows. Consider

Pr(X_{1} + X_{2} + X_{3} ≤ 7) = 1/27 + 3/27 + 6/27 + 7/27 + 6/27 = 23/27 = 0.85185... .

How close is this to what a normal approximation would give? It can readily be seen that the expected value of Y = X_{1} + X_{2} + X_{3} is 6 and the standard deviation of Y is the square root of 2. Since Y ≤ 7 (weak inequality) if and only if Y < 8 (strict inequality), we use a continuity correction and seek

$$\mbox{Pr}(Y\leq 7.5)
=\mbox{P}\left({Y-6 \over \sqrt{2}}\leq{7.5-6 \over \sqrt{2}}\right)
=\mbox{Pr}(Z\leq 1.0606602\dots) = 0.85558\dots$$

where Z has a standard normal distribution. The difference between 0.85185... and 0.85558... seems remarkably small when it is considered that the number of independent random variables that were added was only three.

=== Probability mass function of the sum of 1,000 terms ===

The following image shows the result of a simulation based on the example presented in this page. The extraction from the uniform distribution is repeated 1,000 times, and the results are summed.

Since the simulation is based on the Monte Carlo method, the process is repeated 10,000 times. The results shows that the distribution of the sum of 1,000 uniform extractions resembles the bell-shaped curve very well.
