= Short five lemma =

Special case of the five lemma

In mathematics, especially homological algebra and other applications of abelian category theory, the short five lemma is a special case of the five lemma. It states that for the following commutative diagram (in any abelian category, or in the category of groups), if the rows are short exact sequences, and if g and h are isomorphisms, then f is an isomorphism as well.

It follows immediately from the five lemma.

The essence of the lemma can be summarized as follows: if you have a homomorphism f from an object B to an object B′, and this homomorphism induces an isomorphism from a subobject A of B to a subobject A′ of B′ and also an isomorphism from the factor object B/A to B′/A′, then f itself is an isomorphism. Note however that the existence of f (such that the diagram commutes) has to be assumed from the start; two objects B and B′ that simply have isomorphic sub- and factor objects need not themselves be isomorphic (for example, in the category of abelian groups, B could be the cyclic group of order four and B′ the Klein four-group).
