= Uses of trigonometry =

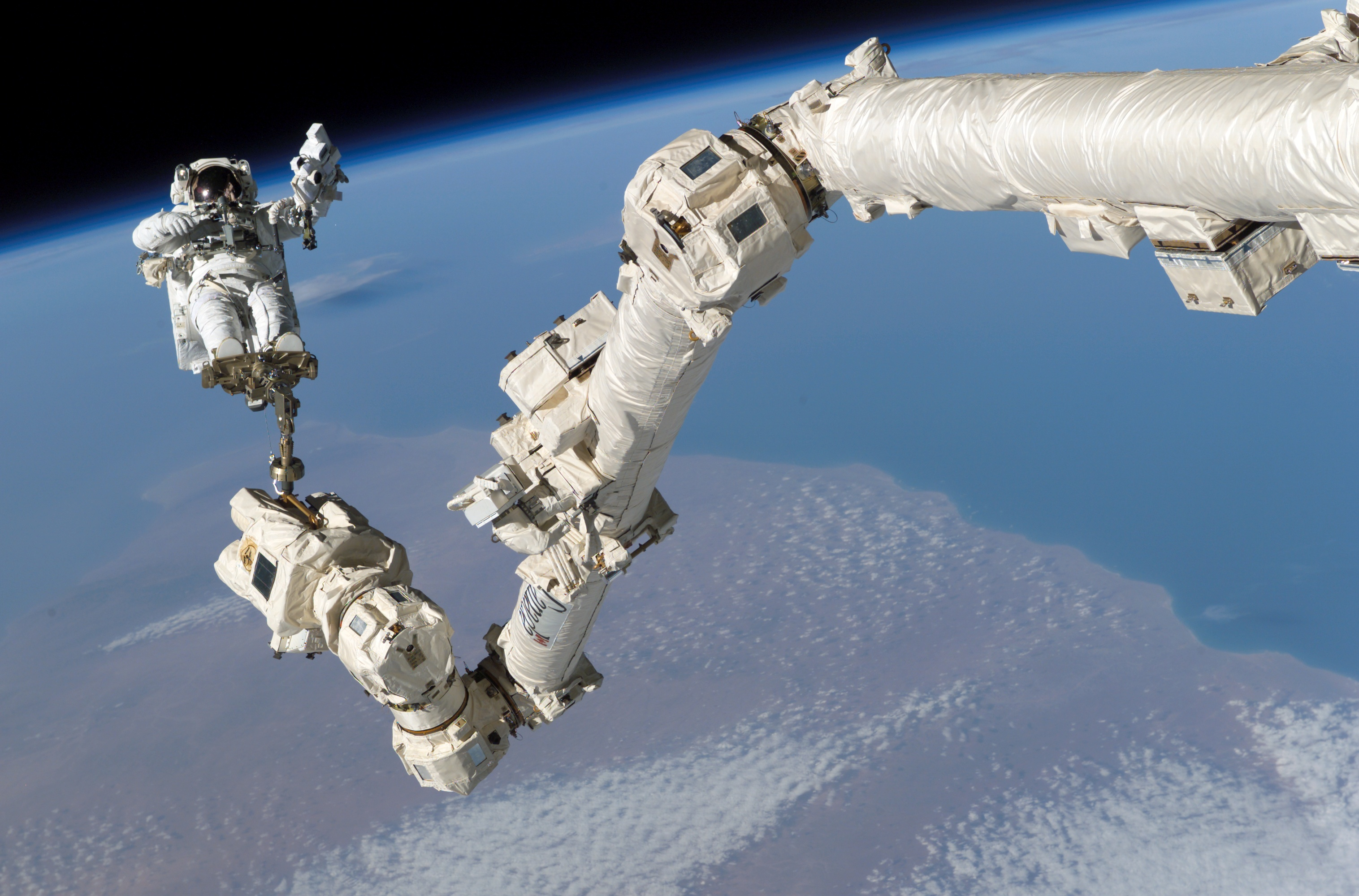
The Canadarm2 robotic manipulator on the International Space Station is operated by controlling the angles of its joints. Calculating the final position of the astronaut at the end of the arm requires repeated use of trigonometric functions of those angles.

Amongst the lay public of non-mathematicians and non-scientists, trigonometry is known chiefly for its application to measurement problems; yet is also often used in ways that are far more subtle, such as its place in the theory of music; still other uses are more technical, such as in number theory. The mathematical topics of Fourier series and Fourier transforms rely heavily on knowledge of trigonometric functions and find application in a number of areas, including statistics.

== Thomas Paine's statement ==
In Chapter XI of The Age of Reason, the American revolutionary and Enlightenment thinker Thomas Paine wrote:

The scientific principles that man employs to obtain the foreknowledge of an eclipse, or of any thing else relating to the motion of the heavenly bodies, are contained chiefly in that part of science that is called trigonometry, or the properties of a triangle, which, when applied to the study of the heavenly bodies, is called astronomy; when applied to direct the course of a ship on the ocean, it is called navigation; when applied to the construction of figures drawn by a ruler and compass, it is called geometry; when applied to the construction of plans of edifices, it is called architecture; when applied to the measurement of any portion of the surface of the earth, it is called land-surveying. In fine, it is the soul of science. It is an eternal truth: it contains the mathematical demonstration of which man speaks, and the extent of its uses are unknown.

== History ==
=== Great Trigonometrical Survey ===
From 1802 until 1871, the Great Trigonometrical Survey was a project to survey the Indian subcontinent with high precision. Starting from the coastal baseline, mathematicians and geographers triangulated vast distances across the country. One of the key achievements was measuring the height of Himalayan mountains, and determining that Mount Everest is the highest point on Earth.

=== Historical use for multiplication ===
For the 25 years preceding the invention of the logarithm in 1614, prosthaphaeresis was the only known generally applicable way of approximating products quickly. It used the identities for the trigonometric functions of sums and differences of angles in terms of the products of trigonometric functions of those angles.

== Some modern uses ==
Scientific fields that make use of trigonometry include:

acoustics, architecture, astronomy, cartography, civil engineering, geophysics, crystallography, electrical engineering, electronics, land surveying and geodesy, many physical sciences, mechanical engineering, machining, medical imaging, number theory, oceanography, optics, pharmacology, probability theory, seismology, statistics, and visual perception

That these fields involve trigonometry does not mean knowledge of trigonometry is needed in order to learn anything about them. It does mean that some things in these fields cannot be understood without trigonometry. For example, a professor of music may perhaps know nothing of mathematics but would probably know that Pythagoras was the earliest known contributor to the mathematical theory of music.

In some of the fields of endeavour listed above it is easy to imagine how trigonometry could be used. For example, in navigation and land surveying, the occasions for the use of trigonometry are in at least some cases simple enough that they can be described in a beginning trigonometry textbook. In the case of music theory, the application of trigonometry is related to work begun by Pythagoras, who observed that the sounds made by plucking two strings of different lengths are consonant if both lengths are small integer multiples of a common length. The resemblance between the shape of a vibrating string and the graph of the sine function is no mere coincidence. In oceanography, the resemblance between the shapes of some waves and the graph of the sine function is also not coincidental. In some other fields, among them climatology, biology, and economics, there are seasonal periodicities. The study of these often involves the periodic nature of the sine and cosine functions.

=== Fourier series ===
Many fields make use of trigonometry in more advanced ways than can be discussed in a single article. Often those involve what are called the Fourier series, after the 18th- and 19th-century French mathematician and physicist Joseph Fourier. Fourier series have a diverse array of applications in many scientific fields, in particular in all of the phenomena involving seasonal periodicities mentioned above, and in wave motion, and hence in the study of radiation, of acoustics, of seismology, of modulation of radio waves in electronics, and of electric power engineering.

A Fourier series is a function series (infinite sum of functions) of the form

$$\begin{align}
& a_0 + a_1 \cos(\theta) + b_1\sin(\theta) + a_2 \cos (2\theta) + b_2\sin (2\theta) + a_3 \cos(3\theta) + b_3 \cos(3\theta) \dotsb
\\
&\qquad = a_0 + \sum_{n=1}^{\infty}\bigl(a_n\cos (n\theta) + b_n\sin (n\theta)\big),
\end{align}$$

with real- or complex-valued coefficients $a_n$ and $b_n$. When the series converges, it represents a periodic function of $\theta$. Fourier used these for studying heat flow and diffusion.

Fourier series are also applicable to subjects whose connection with wave motion is far from obvious. One ubiquitous example is digital compression whereby images, audio and video data are compressed into a much smaller size which makes their transmission feasible over telephone, internet and broadcast networks. Another example, mentioned above, is diffusion. Among others are: the geometry of numbers, isoperimetric problems, recurrence of random walks, quadratic reciprocity, the central limit theorem, Heisenberg's inequality.

=== Fourier transforms ===
A more abstract concept than Fourier series is the idea of Fourier transform. Fourier transforms involve integrals rather than sums, and are used in a similarly diverse array of scientific fields. Many natural laws are expressed by relating rates of change of quantities to the quantities themselves. For example: The rate population change is sometimes jointly proportional to (1) the present population and (2) the amount by which the present population falls short of the carrying capacity. This kind of relationship is called a differential equation. If, given this information, one tries to express population as a function of time, one is trying to solve the differential equation. Fourier transforms may be used to convert some differential equations to algebraic equations for which methods of solving them are known. In almost any scientific context in which the words spectrum, harmonic, or resonance are encountered, Fourier transforms, or Fourier series are nearby.

=== Statistics, including mathematical psychology ===
Intelligence quotients are sometimes held to be distributed according to a bell-shaped curve. About 40% of the area under the curve is in the interval from 100 to 120; correspondingly, about 40% of the population scores between 100 and 120 on IQ tests. Nearly 9% of the area under the curve is in the interval from 120 to 140; correspondingly, about 9% of the population scores between 120 and 140 on IQ tests, etc. Similarly, many other things are distributed according to the "bell-shaped curve", including measurement errors in many physical measurements. The theoretical reason for the ubiquity of the "bell-shaped curve" involves Fourier transforms, and hence trigonometric functions. That is one of a variety of applications of Fourier transforms to statistics.

Trigonometric functions are also applied when statisticians study seasonal periodicities, which are often represented by Fourier series.

=== Number theory ===
There is a hint of a connection between trigonometry and number theory. Loosely speaking, one could say that number theory deals with qualitative properties rather than quantitative properties of numbers.

$$\frac{1}{42}, \qquad \frac{2}{42}, \qquad \frac{3}{42}, \qquad
\dots\dots, \qquad \frac{39}{42}, \qquad \frac{40}{42}, \qquad
\frac{41}{42}.$$

Discard the ones that are not in lowest terms; keep only those that are in lowest terms:

$$\frac{1}{42}, \qquad \frac{5}{42}, \qquad \frac{11}{42}, \qquad
\dots, \qquad \frac{31}{42}, \qquad \frac{37}{42}, \qquad
\frac{41}{42}.$$

Then bring in trigonometry:

$$\cos\left(2\pi\cdot\frac{1}{42}\right)+
\cos\left(2\pi\cdot\frac{5}{42}\right)+
\cdots+
\cos\left(2\pi\cdot\frac{37}{42}\right)+
\cos\left(2\pi\cdot\frac{41}{42}\right)$$

The value of the sum is −1, because 42 has an odd number of prime factors and none of them is repeated: 42 = 2 × 3 × 7. (If there had been an even number of non-repeated factors then the sum would have been 1; if there had been any repeated prime factors (e.g., 60 = 2 × 2 × 3 × 5) then the sum would have been 0; the sum is the Möbius function evaluated at 42.) This hints at the uses of applying Fourier analysis to number theory.

=== Solving non-trigonometric equations ===
Various types of equations can be solved using trigonometry; for example, a linear difference equation or linear differential equation with constant coefficients has solutions expressed in terms of the eigenvalues of its characteristic equation; if some of the eigenvalues are complex, the complex terms can be replaced by trigonometric functions of real terms, showing that the dynamic variable exhibits oscillations.

Similarly, cubic equations with three real solutions have an algebraic solution that is unhelpful in that it contains cube roots of complex numbers; again an alternative solution exists in terms of trigonometric functions of real terms.
