= Candido's identity =

Identity for real numbers

Geometric interpretation of the Candido identity for sequential Fibonacci numbers. The white area equals the grey area and each of them equals half of the outer square's area.

Candido's identity, named after the Italian mathematician Giacomo Candido, is an identity for real numbers. It states that for two arbitrary real numbers $x$ and $y$ the following equality holds:

$$\left[x^2+y^2+(x+y)^2\right]^2=2[x^4+y^4+(x+y)^4]$$

The identity however is not restricted to real numbers but holds in every commutative ring.

Candido originally devised the identity to prove the following identity for Fibonacci numbers:

$$(f_n^2+f_{n+1}^2+f_{n+2}^2)^2=2(f_n^4+f_{n+1}^4+f_{n+2}^4)$$

== Proof ==
A straightforward algebraic proof can be attained by simply completely expanding both sides of the equation. The identity however can also be interpreted geometrically. In this case it states that the area of square with side length $x^2+y^2+(x+y)^2$ equals twice the sum of areas of three squares with side lengths $x^2$, $y^2$ and $(x+y)^2$. This allows for the following proof due to Roger B. Nelsen:

The (white) squares of side lengths $x^2$ and $y^2$ appear each twice and the colored areas equal the area of the white square of side length $(x+y)^2$, hence the area of the outer square equals twice the sum of the areas of the three (white) inner squares.
