= Index of fractal-related articles =

This is a list of fractal topics, by Wikipedia page, See also list of dynamical systems and differential equations topics.

- 1/f noise
- Apollonian gasket
- Attractor
- Box-counting dimension
- Cantor distribution
- Cantor dust
- Cantor function
- Cantor set
- Cantor space
- Chaos theory
- Coastline
- Constructal theory
- Dimension
- Dimension theory
- Dragon curve
- Fatou set
- Fractal
- Fractal antenna
- Fractal art
- Fractal compression
- Fractal flame
- Fractal landscape
- Fractal transform
- Fractint
- Graftal
- Iterated function system
- Horseshoe map
- How Long Is the Coast of Britain? Statistical Self-Similarity and Fractional Dimension
- Julia set
- Koch snowflake
- L-system
- Lebesgue covering dimension
- Lévy C curve
- Lévy flight
- List of fractals by Hausdorff dimension
- Lorenz attractor
- Lyapunov fractal
- Mandelbrot set
- Menger sponge
- Minkowski–Bouligand dimension
- Multifractal analysis
- Olbers' paradox
- Perlin noise
- Power law
- Rectifiable curve
- Scale-free network
- Self-similarity
- Sierpinski carpet
- Sierpiński curve
- Sierpinski triangle
- Space-filling curve
- T-square (fractal)
- Topological dimension
