= List of variational topics =

This is a list of variational topics in from mathematics and physics. See calculus of variations for a general introduction.

- Action (physics)
- Averaged Lagrangian
- Brachistochrone curve
- Calculus of variations
- Catenoid
- Cycloid
- Dirichlet principle
- Euler–Lagrange equation cf. Action (physics)
- Fermat's principle
- Functional (mathematics)
- Functional derivative
- Functional integral
- Geodesic
- Isoperimetry
- Lagrangian
- Lagrangian mechanics
- Legendre transformation
- Luke's variational principle
- Minimal surface
- Morse theory
- Noether's theorem
- Path integral formulation
- Plateau's problem
- Prime geodesic
- Principle of least action
- Soap bubble
- Soap film
- Tautochrone curve
