= G&R =

G&R may refer to:

- Gradshteyn and Ryzhik, a.k.a. Table of Integrals, Series, and Products, a classical book in mathematics
- Guns N' Roses, an American rock band

G&R Autowrecking, legendary local auto wrecker on the West Coast of the USA.
