= Eugene Trubowitz =

American mathematician

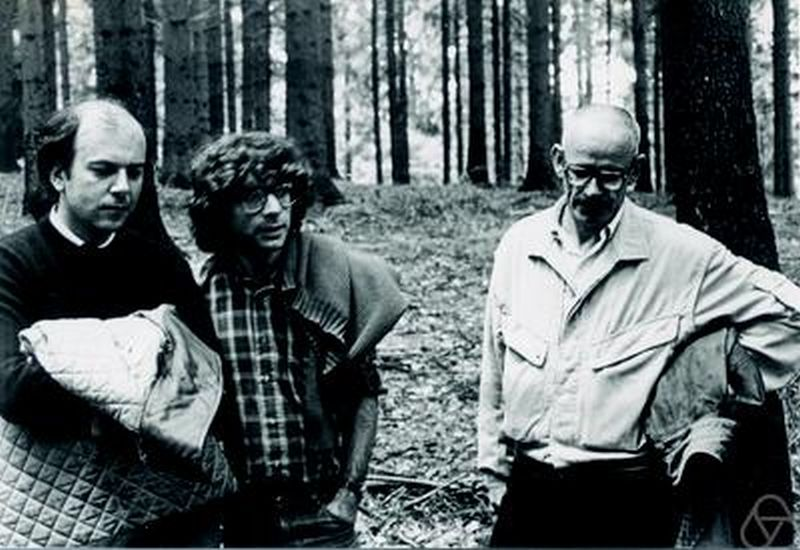
Eugene Trubowitz (center) in Oberwolfach 1984, with Corrado de Concini and Francesco Calogero

Eugene Trubowitz is an American mathematician who studies analysis and mathematical physics. He is a Global Professor of Mathematics at New York University Abu Dhabi.

== Life and work ==
Trubowitz, who was born in 1951, received his doctorate in 1977 under the supervision of Henry McKean at New York University, with thesis titled The inverse problem for periodic potentials. Since 1983, he was a full professor of mathematics at the Swiss Federal Institute of Technology Zurich. As of 2016, he has retired from his position at ETH.

Trubowitz studies scattering theory (some with Percy Deift, and inverse scattering theory), integrable systems and their connection to algebraic geometry, mathematical theory of Fermi liquids in the statistical mechanics.

In 1994 he was an invited speaker at the International Congress of Mathematicians in Zürich; his talk was on A rigorous (renormalization group) analysis of superconducting systems.

== Writings ==
- with Percy Deift: Inverse scattering on the line, Communications on Pure and Applied Mathematics, vol.32, 1979, pp. 121–251 doi:10.1002/cpa.3160320202
- with Joel Feldman, Horst Knörrer: Riemann Surfaces of Infinite Genus, AMS (American Mathematical Society) 2003
- with Feldman, Knörrer: Fermionic functional integrals and the renormalization group, AMS 2002
- with D. Gieseker, Knörrer: Geometry of algebraic Fermi curves, Academic Press 1992
- with Jürgen Pöschel: Inverse spectral theory, Academic Press 1987
