= Chierchia =

Chierchia is an Italian surname. Notable people with the surname include:

- Gennaro Chierchia (born 1953), Italian linguist
- Giuseppe Chierchia (1952–2024), known professionally as Pino D'Angiò, Italian singer-songwriter
- Luigi Chierchia (born 1957), Italian mathematician
