= David Gieseker =

American mathematician

David Arends Gieseker (born 23 November 1943 in Oakland, California) is an American mathematician, specializing in algebraic geometry.

Gieseker received his bachelor's degree in 1965 from Reed College and his master's degree from Harvard University in 1967. In 1970 he received his Ph.D. under Robin Hartshorne with thesis Contributions to the Theory of Positive Embeddings in Algebraic Geometry. Gieseker became a professor at the University of California, Los Angeles in 1975 and became professor emeritus in 2022.

The topics of his research include geometric invariant theory and moduli of vector bundles over algebraic curves.

== Selected publications ==
=== Articles ===
- with Spencer Bloch: Bloch, Spencer; Gieseker, David (1971). "The positivity of the Chern classes of an ample vector bundle". Inventiones Mathematicae. 12 (2): 112–117. doi:10.1007/BF01404655. S2CID 122235253.
- Gieseker, D. (1977). "On the moduli of vector bundles on an algebraic surface". Ann. of Math. 106 (2): 45–60. doi:10.2307/1971157. JSTOR 1971157.
- Gieseker, D. (1977). "Global moduli for surfaces of general type". Inventiones Mathematicae. 43 (3): 233–282. doi:10.1007/BF01390081. S2CID 120365783.
- Gieseker, D. (1979). "On a theorem of Bogomolov on Chern classes of stable bundles". American Journal of Mathematics. 101 (1): 77–85. doi:10.2307/2373939. JSTOR 2373939.
- Gieseker, D. (1982). "Stable curves and special divisors: Petri's conjecture". Inventiones Mathematicae. 66 (2): 251–275. doi:10.1007/BF01389394. S2CID 119765220.
- with Jun Li: "Irreducibility of moduli of rank two vector bundles". J. Differential Geom. 40: 23–104. 1994. doi:10.4310/jdg/1214455287.
- with Jun Li: Gieseker, David; Li, Jun (1996). "Moduli of high rank vector bundles over surfaces". J. Amer. Math. Soc. 9: 107–151. doi:10.1090/S0894-0347-96-00171-3.

=== Books ===
- Lectures on moduli of curves, Tata Institute of Fundamental Research, Springer Verlag 1982; notes by D. R. Gokhale
- with Eugene Trubowitz and Horst Knörrer: Geometry of algebraic Fermi curves, Academic Press 1992
