= Gabriella Pinzari =

Italian mathematician

Gabriella Pinzari is an Italian mathematician known for her research on the n-body problem.

== Research ==
Pinzari's research on the n-body problem has been described as "the most natural way to apply" the Kolmogorov–Arnold–Moser theorem to the problem. The original work of Vladimir Arnold on this theorem attempted to use it to show the stability of the Solar System or similar systems of planetary orbits, but this worked only for the three-body problem because of a degeneracy in Arnold's mathematical framework. Pinzari showed how to eliminate this problem, and extended the solution to larger numbers of bodies, by developing "a rotation-invariant version of the KAM theory".

== Education and career ==
Pinzari earned master's degrees in both physics and mathematics from Sapienza University of Rome, in 1990 and 1996 respectively. She completed her doctorate in 2009 at Roma Tre University under the supervision of Luigi Chierchia. She joined the faculty of the University of Naples Federico II since 2013, and later moved to the University of Padova.

== Recognition ==
She was an Invited Speaker at the 2014 International Congress of Mathematicians, in Seoul, speaking on her work in the session on dynamical systems and ordinary differential equations.
