= Victor Moll =

American mathematician

Victor Hugo Moll (born 1956) is a Chilean American mathematician specializing in analysis.

Moll studied at the Universidad Técnica Federico Santa María and at the New York University with a master's degree in 1982 and a doctorate in 1984 with Henry P. McKean (Stability in the Large for Solitary Wave Solutions to McKean's Nerve Conduction Caricature). He was a post-doctoral student at Temple University and became an assistant professor in 1986 and an associate professor in 1992 and in 2001 Professor at Tulane University.

In 1990–1991, he was a visiting professor at the University of Utah, in 1999 at the Universidad Técnica Federico Santa María in Valparaíso, and in 1995 a visiting scientist at the Courant Institute of Mathematical Sciences of New York University.

He deals with classical analysis, symbolic arithmetic and experimental mathematics, special functions and number theory.

== Projects ==
Inspired by a 1988 paper in which Ilan Vardi proved several integrals in Table of Integrals, Series, and Products, a well-known comprehensive table of integrals originally compiled by the Russian mathematicians Iosif Moiseevich Ryzhik (Russian: Иосиф Моисеевич Рыжик) and Izrail Solomonovich Gradshteyn (Израиль Соломонович Градштейн) in 1943 and subsequently expanded and translated into several languages, Victor Moll and George Boros started a project to prove all integrals listed in Gradshteyn and Ryzhik and add additional commentary and references. In the foreword of the book Irresistible Integrals (2004), they wrote:

It took a short time to realize that this task was monumental.

Nevertheless, the efforts have resulted in about 900 entries from Gradshteyn and Ryzhik discussed in a series of more than 30 articles of which papers 1 to 28 have been published in issues 14 to 26 of Scientia, Universidad Técnica Federico Santa María (UTFSM), between 2007 and 2015 and compiled into a two-volume book series Special Integrals of Gradshteyn and Ryzhik: the Proofs (2014–2015). Moll also assisted Daniel Zwillinger editing the eighth English edition of Gradshteyn and Ryzhik in 2014.

Moll also took on the task to revise and expand the classical landmark work "A Course of Modern Analysis" by Whittaker and Watson, which was originally published in 1902 and last revised in 1927, to publish a new edition in 2021.

== Publications ==
- The evaluation of integrals, a personal story, Notices AMS, 2002, No. 3
- with Henry McKean Elliptic Curves: function theory, geometry, arithmetic, Cambridge University Press, 1997
- Numbers and functions: from a classical-experimental mathematician’s point of view, AMS, 2012
- Editor with Tewodros Amdeberhan Tapas in experimental mathematics, AMS Special Session on Experimental Mathematics, January 5, 2007, New Orleans, Louisiana, AMS, 2008
- Editor with Tewodros Amdeberhan, Luis A. Medina Gems in experimental mathematics, AMS Special Session, Experimental Mathematics, January 5, 2009, Washington, DC, AMS, 2010
- with George Boros Irresistible Integrals: Symbolics, Analysis and Experiments in the Evaluation of Integrals, Cambridge University Press, 2004.
- A Course of Modern Analysis, 2021

== See also ==
- Gradshteyn and Ryzhik (GR)
- Whittaker and Watson
