= Lothar Berg =

German mathematician (1930–2015)

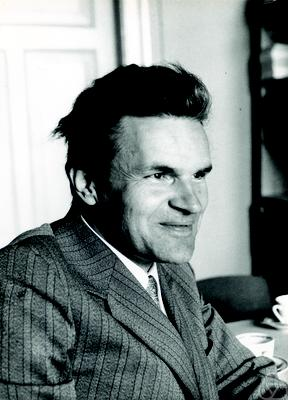
Lothar Berg in 1974

Lothar Berg (born 28 July 1930 in Stettin; died 27 July 2015 in Rostock) was a German mathematician and university teacher.

== Work and life ==
Lothar Berg graduated from high school in Neustrelitz in 1949 and then studied mathematics and physics at the University of Rostock. In 1953, he began a two-year postgraduate course at the University of Rostock. In 1955, he received his doctorate under Ludwig Holzer and Hans Schubert ("Allgemeine Kriterien zur Massbestimmung Linearer Punktmengen", English: General criteria for the measurement of linear point sets). Lothar Berg then went to the Technical University of Electrical Engineering in Ilmenau as a senior assistant (from 1958 as university lecturer).

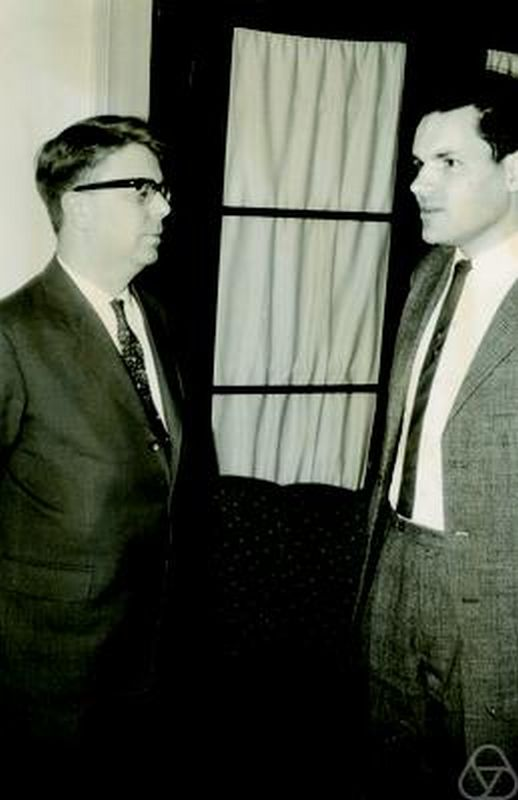
Wolfgang Engel (left) with Lothar Berg (right), Rostock 1967

From 1959 to 1965 Berg was a professor of mathematics at the University of Halle. From 1965 until his retirement in 1996 he was professor of analysis at the University of Rostock. He accompanied a large number of young mathematicians in their research work. His students included the later university teachers Karl-Heinz Kutschke, Manfred Taschen, Manfred Krüppel and Dieter Schott.

Lothar Berg was a board member of the Mathematische Gesellschaft der Deutschen Demokratischen Republik (English: Mathematical Society of the German Democratic Republic) from 1981 to 1990 and a member of the Leopoldina from 1970 until his death.

In 1973, he received the University Medal of the University of Jyväskylä, Finland, and the Second University Prize by the University of Rostock in 1978 as well as the Ehrenmedaille of the Mathematische Gesellschaft der Deutschen Demokratischen Republik, Berlin, in 1990. In 2005, he received the Golden DMV Plaquette by the German Mathematical Society.

Lothar Berg has also been listed as a noteworthy mathematics educator by Marquis Who's Who.

Since 27 May 1952, he was married to a co-translator of various Russian math books into German, Christa Berg née Jahncke. They had two children.

== Publications ==
- Einführung in die Operatorenrechnung. Berlin, 1962.
- Asymptotische Darstellungen und Entwicklungen (in Hochschulbücher für Mathematik Vol. 66). Berlin, 1968.
- Operatorenrechnung I. Algebraische Methoden. Berlin, 1972.
- Operatorenrechnung II. Funktionentheoretische Methoden. Berlin, 1974.
- Differenzengleichungen zweiter Ordnung mit Anwendungen. Berlin, 1979.
- Lineare Gleichungssysteme mit Bandstruktur. Berlin, 1986.

== Translations ==
- Summen-, Produkt- und Integral-Tafeln aka "Ryzhik-Gradshteyn"
- Lehrgang der höheren Mathematik aka "Smirnov"

== See also ==
- Gradshteyn and Ryzhik (GR)
- A Course in Higher Mathematics
