= Henry McKean =

American mathematician (1930–2024)

- Born: December 10, 1930; Wenham, Massachusetts, U.S.
- Died: April 20, 2024 (aged 93)
- Education: Princeton University
- Known for: McKean–Vlasov processes
- Awards: Leroy P. Steele Prize (2007)
- Scientific career
- Thesis: Sample Functions of Stable Processes (1955)
- Doctoral advisor: William Feller
- Doctoral students: Michael Arbib; Luigi Chierchia; Adrian Constantin; Donald A. Dawson; Harry Dym; Richard S. Ellis; Daniel Stroock; Eugene Trubowitz; Pierre van Moerbeke; Victor Moll; Terry Lyons

Henry P. McKean, Jr. (December 10, 1930 – April 20, 2024) was an American mathematician at the Courant Institute in New York University. He worked in various areas of analysis. He obtained his PhD in 1955 from Princeton University under William Feller.

McKean was elected to the National Academy of Sciences in 1980. In 2007, he was awarded the Leroy P. Steele Prize for his life's work. In 1978, he was an invited speaker at the International Congress of Mathematicians in Helsinki (Algebraic curves of infinite genus arising in the theory of nonlinear waves). In 2012, he became a fellow of the American Mathematical Society.

His doctoral students include Michael Arbib, Luigi Chierchia, Donald A. Dawson, Harry Dym, Daniel Stroock, Eugene Trubowitz, Victor Moll and Pierre van Moerbeke and Uri Keich.

McKean died on April 20, 2024, aged 93.

The American Mathematical Society published a Memorial Tribute to him in its March 2025 issue.

== Works ==
=== Selected articles ===
- McKean, H. P. (1956). "Elementary solutions for certain parabolic partial differential equations". Trans. Amer. Math. Soc. 82 (2): 519–548. doi:10.1090/S0002-9947-1956-0087012-3. MR 0087012.
- Blumenthal, R. M.; Getoor, R. K.; McKean Jr., H. P. (1962). "Markov processes with identical hitting distributions". Bull. Amer. Math. Soc. 68 (4): 372–374. doi:10.1090/S0002-9904-1962-10813-1. ISSN 0002-9904.
- Levinson, N.; McKean, H. P. (1964). "Weighted trigonometrical approximation on $R^1$ with application to the germ field of a stationary Gaussian process". Bull. Amer. Math. Soc. 70: 128–129. doi:10.1090/S0002-9904-1964-11049-1.
- McKean, H. P.; Singer, I. M. (1967). "Curvature and the eigenvalues of the Laplacian". J. Differential Geom. 1 (1–2): 43–69. doi:10.4310/jdg/1214427880. ISSN 0273-0979.
- McKean, H. P. (1969). "A simple model of the derivation of fluid mechanics from the Boltzmann equation". Bull. Amer. Math. Soc. 75: 1–10. doi:10.1090/S0002-9904-1969-12128-2. MR 0235792.
- McKean, H. P.; Trubowitz, E. (1978). "Hill's surfaces and their theta functions". Bull. Amer. Math. Soc. 84 (6): 1042–1085. doi:10.1090/S0002-9904-1978-14542-X.
- McKean, H. P.; Moll, V. (1985). "A threshold for a caricature of the nerve equation". Bull. Amer. Math. Soc. 12 (2): 255–260. doi:10.1090/S0273-0979-1985-15367-4. ISSN 0273-0979.

=== Books ===
- with Kiyosi Itô: Diffusion processes and their sample paths. Springer 1965.
- Stochastic Integrals. New York 1969.
- with Harry Dym: Fourier series and integrals. New York 1972.
- with Harry Dym: Gaussian processes, function theory and the inverse spectral problem, Academic Press 1976
- with Victor Moll: Elliptic Curves. Cambridge 1997.
- Probability: The Classical Limit Theorems, Cambridge University Press, 2014

== See also ==
- McKean's theorem
- McKean–Vlasov process
