= Edwin Plimpton Adams =

American mathematician

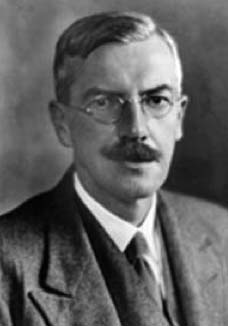
- Born: January 23, 1878; Prague, Bohemia-Moravia
- Died: December 31, 1956 (aged 78); Princeton, New Jersey, USA
- Education: Harvard University
- Scientific career
- Fields: Mathematics; Physics
- Institutions: Princeton University

Edwin Plimpton Adams (Prague, 23 January 1878 – Princeton, New Jersey, 31 December 1956) was an American physicist known for translating Einstein's lectures. Clinton Joseph Davisson attended his lectures. Adams was elected to the American Philosophical Society in 1915.

== Biography ==
=== Early life and education ===
Edwin Plimpton Adams was born in Prague, at the time part of Bohemia, on 23 January 1878 to missionary parents. His father, Rev. Edwin Augustus Adams (1837–1927), was an American pastor from Connecticut, who spent 10 years as a representative of the American Board of Foreign Missions in Prague, before moving back the family back to Northboro, Connecticut, and then Chicago. His mother was Caroline Amelia Plimpton (1842–1928).

Adams earned his bachelor's degree at Beloit College in 1899 and PhD in physics at Harvard University in 1904. During his graduate studies he was a Tyndall fellow at Harvard which allowed him to study at Berlin, Göttingen, and Trinity College, Cambridge.

=== Career ===
In 1903, Adams was hired as an instructor for the Princeton University Physics Department, helping expand the four person department originally consisting of Cyrus Fogg Brackett, William Francis Magie, E. H. Loomis, and Howard McClenahan. During his first few years, Adams taught courses in a number of subjects at the undergraduate and graduate level and took on graduate students to work on experimental research in electricity and magnetism. He became a full professor in 1909 and his research interests later shifted to theory when he took over teaching advanced theoretical physics and applied mathematics courses when James H Jeans left Princeton to return to England.

During World War I, Adams took leave from Princeton to join the Royal Engineers of the British Army. He was in active service in France with a sound-ranging company from 1917 to 1919, and he was later made an Officer of the Order of the British Empire.

== Selected publications ==
- Adams, Edwin Plimpton; Hippisley, Richard Lionel (1922). Greenhill, Alfred George (ed.). Smithsonian Mathematical Formulae and Tables of Elliptic Functions. Smithsonian Miscellaneous Collections. Vol. 74 (1 ed.). Washington D.C., USA: Smithsonian Institution. (NB. A significant number of entries of this book were later included in Iosif Moiseevich Ryzhik's integral table Tables of integrals, sums, series and products (Таблицы интегралов, сумм, рядов и произведений) in 1945.)
