= Donald A. Dawson =

Canadian mathematician

Donald Andrew Dawson
- Born: June 4, 1937 (age 88)
- Education: McGill University; MIT
- Scientific career
- Institutions: Raytheon; McGill University; Carleton University
- Thesis: Constructions of Diffusions with Specified Mean Hitting Times and Hitting Probabilities (1963)
- Doctoral advisor: Henry McKean
- Doctoral students: Brenda MacGibbon

Donald Andrew Dawson (born June 4, 1937) is a Canadian mathematician, specializing in probability.

== Education and career ==
Dawson received in 1958 his bachelor's degree and in 1959 his master's degree from McGill University and in 1963 his PhD from MIT under Henry McKean with thesis Constructions of Diffusions with Specified Mean Hitting Times and Hitting Probabilities. In 1962/63 he was an engineer in the aerospace department of Raytheon. At McGill University he became in 1963 an assistant professor and in 1967 an associate professor. At Carleton University he became in 1970 an associate professor and in 1971 a professor, working in this position until 1996.

From 1996 to 2000 Dawson was the director of the Fields Institute and during these years also an adjunct professor at the University of Toronto. From 2000 to 2010 he was an adjunct professor at McGill University.

== Research ==
Dawson works on stochastic processes, measure-valued processes, and hierarchical stochastic systems with applications in information systems, genetics, evolutionary biology, and economics. He has written 8 monographs and over 150 refereed publications.

In 1994 he was an invited speaker at the International Congress of Mathematicians in Zürich with lecture Interaction and hierarchy in measure-valued processes. From 2003 to 2005 he was the president of the Bernoulli Society.

== Honors and awards ==
- Fellow of the International Statistical Institute 1975
- Fellow of the Institute of Mathematical Statistics 1977
- Killam Senior Research Scholar 1977–1979
- Fellow of the Royal Society of Canada, Academy of Sciences 1987
- Gold Medal of the Statistical Society of Canada 1991
- Jeffery–Williams Prize 1994
- Max Planck Research Award for International Cooperation 1996–2000
- CRM-Fields-PIMS Prize 2004
- Honorary Member of the Statistical Society of Canada 2004
- Fellow of the Royal Society 2010
- Fellow of the American Mathematical Society 2012
- Inaugural fellow of the Canadian Mathematical Society, 2018

== Selected works ==
- with Edwin A. Perkins: Measure-valued processes and Renormalization of Branching Particle Systems, in R. Carmona, B. Rozovskii Stochastic Partial Differential Equations: Six Perspectives, American Mathematical Society Mathematical Surveys and Monographs, vol. 64, 1999, pp. 45–106.
- with J. T. Cox, A. Greven: Mutually catalytic super branching random walks: large finite systems and renormalization analysis, American Mathematical Society 2004
- as editor: Measure-valued processes, stochastic partial differential equations, and interacting systems, American Mathematical Society 1994
- with Edwin Perkins: Historical processes, American Mathematical Society 1991
- with J. Gärtner: Large deviations, free energy functional and quasi-potential for a mean field model of interacting diffusions, American Mathematical Society 1989
