= Paragraph =

Self-contained unit of discourse in writing

A paragraph is a self-contained unit of discourse in writing dealing with a particular point or idea, or starting a line of dialogue. Though not required by the orthographic conventions of any language with a writing system, paragraphs are a conventional means of organizing extended segments of prose.

The word paragraph ultimately derives from Ancient Greek: παράγραφος (parágraphos), meaning "to written beside".

== History ==
Cuneiform is one of the oldest surviving forms of writing. It was used in Mesopotamia to compose a tremendous number of texts on clay tablets, thousands of which survive to the present day. Cuneiform had no paragraphs or even spacing between words with the symbols all written directly adjacent to one another. Egyptian hieroglyphics were also unspaced, but as they wrote on papyrus with ink, Egyptians scribes introduced the practice of rubrication: the scribes used black ink for the main body text and contrasting red ink for headings.

Greek scribes developed other approaches to organizing text, although the earliest Greek and Latin documents were written in solid blocks of capital letters with little to no spacing, paragraph breaks, or punctuation. Some of the oldest Greek inscriptions were written boustrophedon (literally 'as the ox turns') where the direction of the text's flow and the direction the letters face would switch at the end of each line, as an ox plowing a field would reverse directions. Over time, text direction (left to right) became standardized. Word dividers and punctuation were developed in Hellenistic Alexandria, but were only gradually adopted over centuries. Literature scholars believe that early manuscripts lacking in punctuation and spacing were meant to be read aloud.

The paragraphos was introduced by scribes in the 4th century AD as a line placed beside a block of text. These marginal symbols evolved into a pair of abbreviations. A stylized K, for kaput/caput or 'head', was placed at the beginning of new sections; a C, for capitulum or 'little head', which evolved into the pilcrow (¶), was placed at the beginning of subsections that modern readers would recognize as paragraphs. In many English manuscripts in the Middle Ages, pilcrows were also placed inline between sentences. Spaces were left at the beginning of paragraphs in early print documents for rubricators to hand-draw the pilcrows. These spaces were eventually left un-rubricated, leading to the modern tradition of indenting a paragraph. Using spacing alone to separate paragraphs eventually became standard.

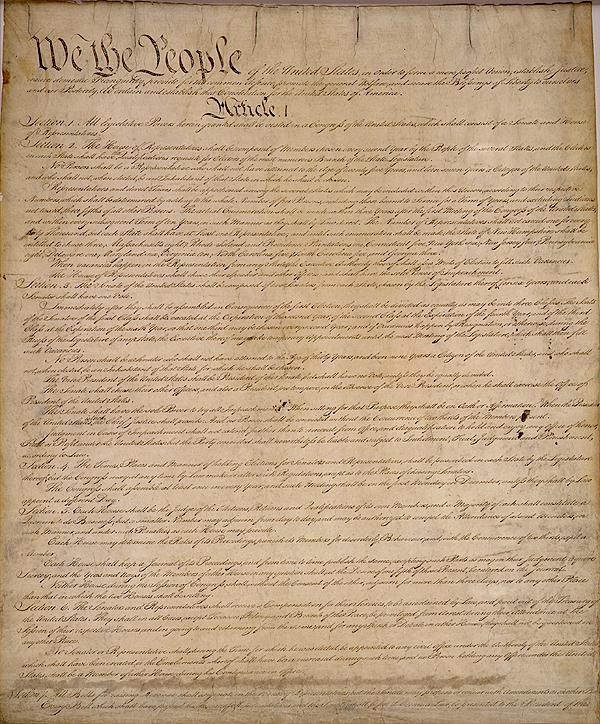
Indented paragraphs demonstrated in the US Constitution

Ancient manuscripts also divided sentences into paragraphs with line breaks (newline) followed by an initial at the beginning of the next paragraph. An initial is an oversized capital letter, sometimes outdented beyond the margin of the text. This style can be seen, for example, in the original Old English manuscript of Beowulf. Outdenting is still used in English typography, though not commonly. Modern English typography usually indicates a new paragraph by indenting the first line. This style can be seen in the (handwritten) United States Constitution from 1787. For additional ornamentation, a hedera leaf or other symbol can be added to the inter-paragraph white space, or put in the indentation space.

A second common modern English style is to use no indenting, but add vertical white space to create "block paragraphs." On a typewriter, a double carriage return produces a blank line for this purpose; professional typesetters (or word processing software) may put in an arbitrary vertical space by adjusting leading. This style is very common in electronic formats, such as on the World Wide Web and email. Wikipedia itself employs this format.

== Typographical considerations ==
Professionally printed material in English typically does not indent the first paragraph, but indents those that follow. For example, Robert Bringhurst states that we should "Set opening paragraphs flush left." Bringhurst explains as follows:

The function of a paragraph is to mark a pause, setting the paragraph apart from what precedes it. If a paragraph is preceded by a title or subhead, the indent is superfluous and can therefore be omitted.

The Elements of Typographic Style states that "at least one en [space]" should be used to indent paragraphs after the first, noting that that is the "practical minimum". An em space is the most commonly used paragraph indent. Miles Tinker, in his book Legibility of Print, concluded that indenting the first line of paragraphs increases readability by 7%, on average.

When referencing a paragraph, typographic symbol U+00A7 § SECTION SIGN (&sect;) may be used: "See § Background".

In modern usage, paragraph initiation is typically indicated by one or more of a preceding blank line, indentation, an "Initial" ("drop cap") or other indication. Historically, the pilcrow symbol (¶) was used in Latin and western European languages. Other languages have their own marks with similar function.

Widows and orphans occur when the first line of a paragraph is the last in a column or page, or when the last line of a paragraph is the first line of a new column or page.

== In computing ==
In word processing and desktop publishing, a hard return or paragraph break indicates a new paragraph, to be distinguished from the soft return at the end of a line internal to a paragraph. This distinction allows word wrap to automatically re-flow text as it is edited, without losing paragraph breaks. The software may apply vertical white space or indenting at paragraph breaks, depending on the selected style.

How such documents are actually stored depends on the file format. For example, HTML uses the <p> tag as a paragraph container. In plaintext files, there are two common formats. The pre-formatted text will have a newline at the end of every physical line, and two newlines at the end of a paragraph, creating a blank line. An alternative is to only put newlines at the end of each paragraph, and leave word wrapping up to the application that displays or processes the text.

A line break that is inserted manually, and preserved when re-flowing, may still be distinct from a paragraph break, although this is typically not done in prose. HTML's <br /> tag produces a line break without ending the paragraph; the W3C recommends using it only to separate lines of verse (where each "paragraph" is a stanza), or in a street address.

== Numbering ==
Paragraphs are commonly numbered using the decimal system, where (in books) the integral part of the decimal represents the number of the chapter and the fractional parts are arranged in each chapter in order of magnitude. Thus in Whittaker and Watson's 1921 A Course of Modern Analysis, chapter 9 is devoted to Fourier Series; within that chapter §9.6 introduces Riemann's theory, the following section §9.61 treats an associated function, following §9.62 some properties of that function, following §9.621 a related lemma, while §9.63 introduces Riemann's main theorem, and so on. Whittaker and Watson attribute this system of numbering to Giuseppe Peano on their "Contents" page, although this attribution does not seem to be widely credited elsewhere. Gradshteyn and Ryzhik is another book using this scheme since its third edition in 1951.

== Section breaks ==
Many published books use a device to separate certain paragraphs further when there is a change of scene or time. This extra space, especially when co-occurring at a page or section break, may contain a special symbol known as a dinkus, a fleuron, or a stylistic dingbat.

== Style advice ==
The crafting of clear, coherent paragraphs is the subject of considerable stylistic debate. The form varies among different types of writing. For example, newspapers, scientific journals, and fictional essays have somewhat different conventions for the placement of paragraph breaks.

A common English usage misconception is that a paragraph has three to five sentences; single-word paragraphs can be seen in some professional writing, and journalists often use single-sentence paragraphs.

English students are sometimes taught that a paragraph should have a topic sentence or "main idea", preferably first, and multiple "supporting" or "detail" sentences that explain or supply evidence. One technique of this type, intended for essay writing, is known as the Schaffer paragraph. Topic sentences are largely a phenomenon of school-based writing, and the convention does not necessarily obtain in other contexts. This advice is also culturally specific, for example, it differs from stock advice for the construction of paragraphs in Japanese (translated as danraku 段落).

== See also ==
- Inverted pyramid (journalism)
