= Michael A. Arbib =

American computational neuroscientist

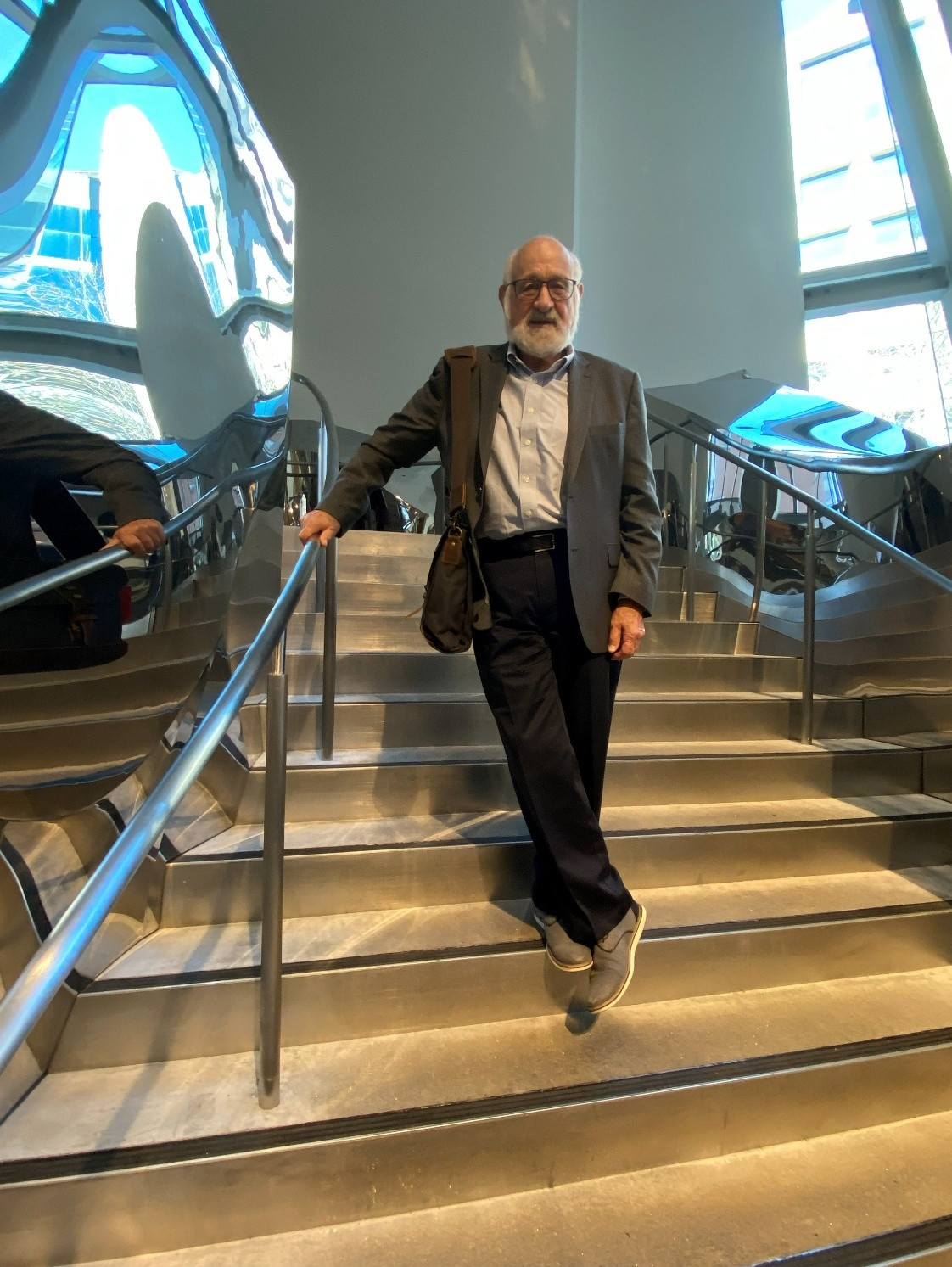
- Born: Michael Anthony Arbib; England
- Education: University of Sydney; Massachusetts Institute of Technology
- Known for: Brains, Machines and Mathematics
- Scientific career
- Institutions: University of Southern California
- Academic advisors: Norbert Wiener

Michael Anthony Arbib (born May 28, 1940) is a brain theorist and cybernetician whose work has been influential in theoretical neuroscience, artificial intelligence, cognitive science, robotics, mathematical systems theory, language evolution, and the conversation between architecture and neuroscience. Since his retirement from the University of Southern California in 2016, he has held emeritus status there as University Professor, Fletcher Jones Professor of Computer Science and Professor in biological sciences biomedical engineering, electrical engineering, neuroscience, and psychology.

== Early life and education ==
Arbib was born in England on May 28, 1940, the oldest of four children. His parents moved to New Zealand when he was 7, and on to Australia when he was 9. and attended high school at The Scots College in Sydney, Australia. In 1960 he took a BSc (Hons) at the University of Sydney, with the University Medal in Pure Mathematics. However, his interests shifted from pure mathematics to the fields of cybernetics and automata theory, and his honours thesis on Turing Machines, Finite Automata, and Neural Nets was published in 1961.

Arbib received his PhD in mathematics from the Massachusetts Institute of Technology in 1963. He was advised by Norbert Wiener, the founder of cybernetics, and Henry McKean. As a student, he also worked with Warren McCulloch, the co-inventor of the artificial neural network and finite-state machine. In the summer of 1962, he gave a series of lectures at the University of New South Wales, Sydney, which became the basis of his first book, Brains, Machines and Mathematics. The book was reviewed in Scientific American by Jacob Bronowski, and translated into Chinese, Italian, Japanese, Polish, Russian, and Spanish.

== Career ==
Following his PhD, Arbib had a postdoc at Imperial College with Jack Cowan, during which he wrote a foundational paper linking automata theory and system theory, conducted a lecture tour of Europe and the Soviet Union, and lectured for a term at the University of New south Wales before moving to Stanford for a postdoc with Rudolf E. Kálmán.

Arbib spent five years at Stanford, before becoming the founding chairman of the Department of Computer and Information Science at the University of Massachusetts Amherst in 1970. He remained in the department until 1986, when he joined the University of Southern California. He retired and was granted emeritus status in 2016.

Arbib's collected papers from the period 1960 through 1985 are held by the University of Massachusetts Amherst. while those from 1986 through 2016 are held at the University of Southern California.

As part of this work, he established the Laboratory for Perceptual Robotics while at the University of Massachusetts. This work helped connect distributed artificial intelligence with biologically grounded brain theory, particularly through computational models of vision, navigation, and action. His influence was recognized by the naming of an adaptive robot as the ARBIB (Autonomous Robot Based on Inspirations from Biology).

== Awards and honors ==
- Best Book Award, American Society for Information Science 1973
- Fellow of the Association for the Advancement of Artificial Intelligence (AAAI) 1992
- Honorary Member (Socio Onorario), Società di Medicina e Scienze Naturali, University of Parma 1992
- IEEE Neural Networks Pioneer Award 1995
- Doctor of Science (honoris causa), University of Western Australia 2004
- Fellow of the American Association for the Advancement of Science (AAAS) 2008
- Helmholtz Prize, International Neural Network Society 2009
- Doctor Honoris Causa, University of Western Bohemia, 2021
