= Dimension doubling theorem =

Theorem in probability theory

In probability theory, the dimension doubling theorems are two results about the Hausdorff dimension of an image of a Brownian motion. In their core both statements say, that the dimension of a set $A$ under a Brownian motion doubles almost surely.

The first result is due to Henry P. McKean jr and hence called McKean's theorem (1955). The second theorem is a refinement of McKean's result and called Kaufman's theorem (1969) since it was proven by Robert Kaufman.

== Dimension doubling theorems ==
Let $(\Omega,\mathcal{F},P)$ be a probability space. For a $d$-dimensional Brownian motion $W(t)$ and a set $A\subset [0,\infty)$ we define the image of $A$ under $W$, i.e.

$$W(A):=\{W(t): t\in A\}\subset \R^d.$$

=== McKean's theorem ===
Let $W(t)$ be a Brownian motion in dimension $d\geq 2$. Let $A\subset [0,\infty)$, then

$$\dim W(A)=2\dim A$$

$P$-almost surely.

=== Kaufman's theorem ===
Let $W(t)$ be a Brownian motion in dimension $d\geq 2$. Then $P$-almost surely, for any set $A\subset [0,\infty)$, we have

$$\dim W(A)=2\dim A.$$

=== Difference of the theorems ===
The difference of the theorems is the following: in McKean's result the $P$-null sets, where the statement is not true, depends on the choice of $A$. Kaufman's result on the other hand is true for all choices of $A$ simultaneously. This means Kaufman's theorem can also be applied to random sets $A$.

== Literature ==
- Mörters, Peter; Peres, Yuval (2010). Brownian Motion. Cambridge: Cambridge University Press. p. 279.
- Schilling, René L.; Partzsch, Lothar (2014). Brownian Motion. De Gruyter. p. 169.
