= Brenda MacGibbon =

Canadian statistician (1944–2022)

- Born: July 31, 1944
- Died: October 7, 2022 (aged 78); Montreal, Quebec, Canada
- Education: McGill University (MSc, PhD)
- Spouse: John Taylor
- Children: 3
- Scientific career
- Fields: Mathematics
- Thesis: K-Analytic Spaces and Countable Operations in Topology (1970)
- Doctoral advisor: Donald A. Dawson

Kathryn Brenda MacGibbon-Taylor (July 31, 1944 – October 7, 2022) was a Canadian mathematician, statistician, and decision scientist. She was a professor of mathematics at the Université du Québec à Montréal and was affiliated with the Group for Research in Decision Analysis.

== Education and career ==
MacGibbon began her career in pure mathematics, at McGill University. She earned a master's degree there in 1966, working with Michael Herschorn on differential equations, and completed a Ph.D. in 1970, with a dissertation on topology supervised by Donald A. Dawson.

As well as McGill and the Université du Québec à Montréal, she has also been affiliated with the Department of Decision Sciences and Management Information Systems at Concordia University in Montreal, where she was hired in 1986. By 1993 she had moved to the Université du Québec à Montréal.

== Research ==
Although MacGibbon's research has covered a wide range of topics in statistics, including applications of statistics in the study of premenstrual syndrome, and the use of smart shoes to monitor the rehabilitation of patients with hip fractures, she was particularly known for her work in theoretical statistics on minimax estimators with constrained parameters.

== Recognition ==
MacGibbon became the first woman to chair the Statistical Sciences Grant Selection Committee of the Canadian Natural Sciences and Engineering Research Council, in 1993. She was a Fellow of the Institute of Mathematical Statistics.

== Personal life ==
MacGibbon was married to John Taylor, with whom she had 3 children. She died from complications of Alzheimer's disease and ALS on October 7, 2022, at the age of 78.
