= A Course of Modern Analysis =

Textbook in mathematical analysis

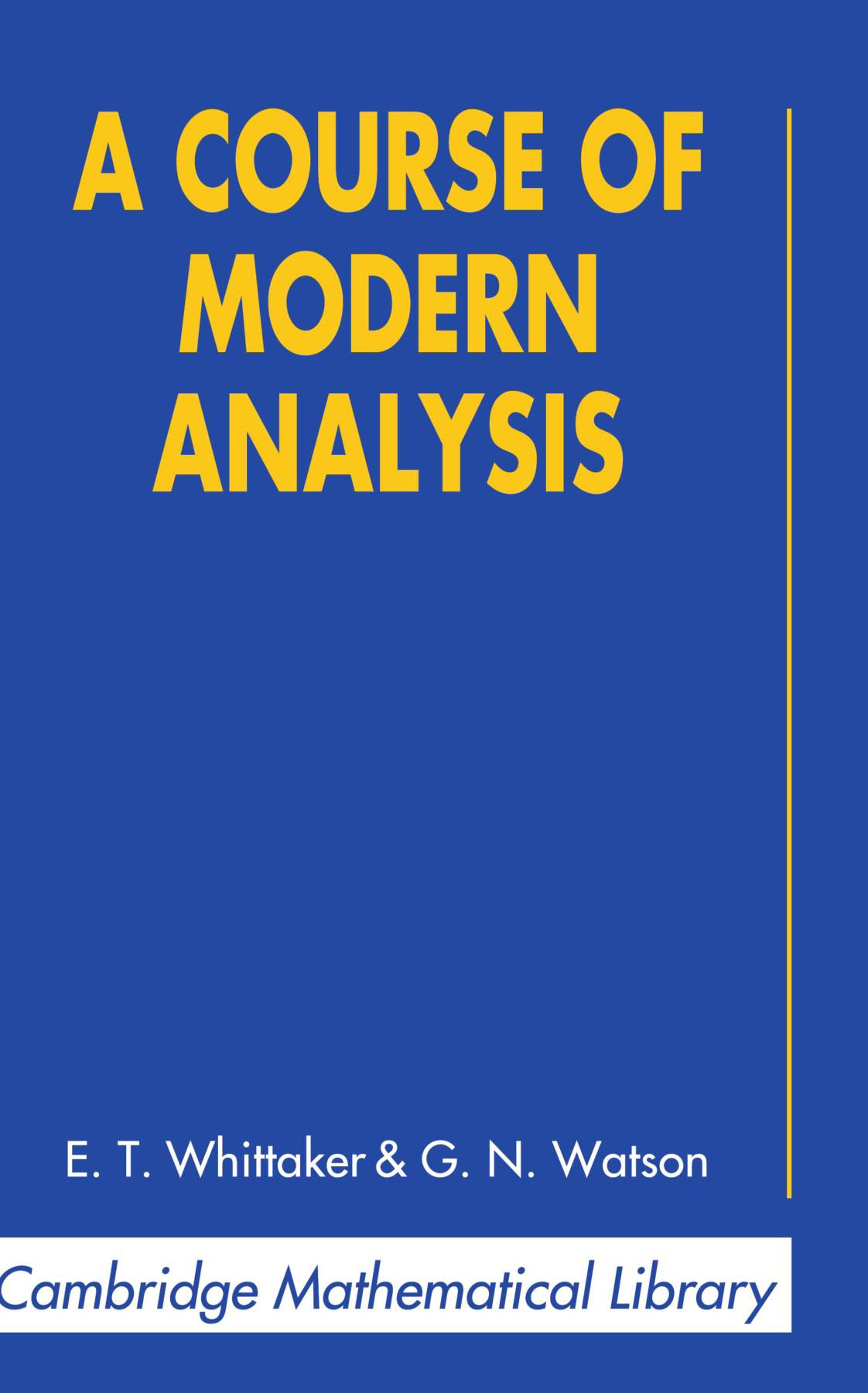
- Cover of a 1996 reissue of the fourth edition of the book.
- Author: Edmund T. Whittaker and George N. Watson
- Language: English
- Subject: Mathematics
- Publisher: Cambridge University Press
- Publication date: 1902

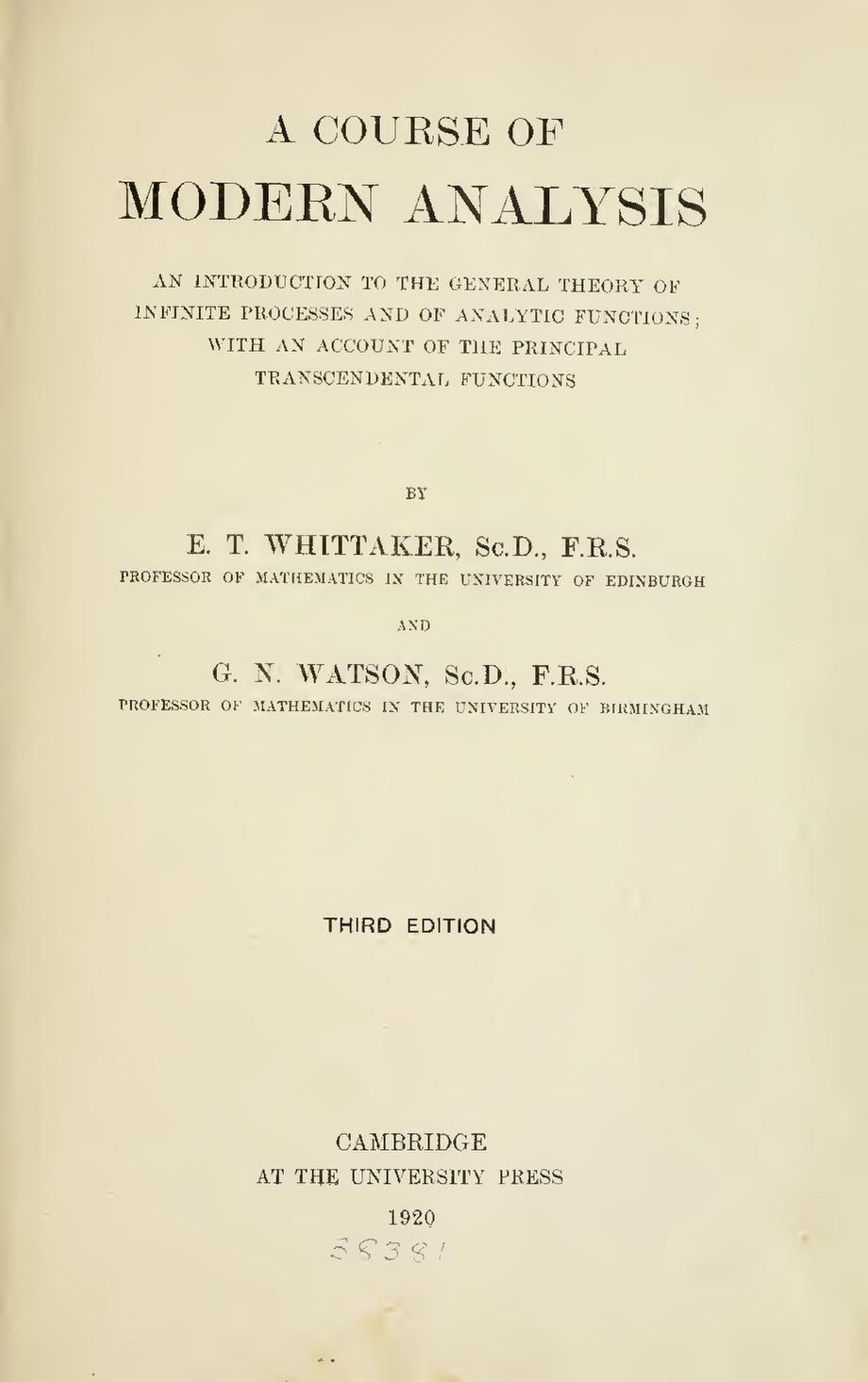
Title page for the third edition of the book.

A Course of Modern Analysis: an introduction to the general theory of infinite processes and of analytic functions; with an account of the principal transcendental functions (colloquially known as Whittaker and Watson) is a landmark textbook on mathematical analysis written by Edmund T. Whittaker and George N. Watson, first published by Cambridge University Press in 1915. The first edition was Whittaker's alone, but later editions were co-authored with Watson.

== History ==
Its first, second, third, and the fourth edition were published in 1902, 1915, 1920, and 1927, respectively. Since then, it has continuously been reprinted and is still in print today. A revised, expanded and digitally reset fifth edition, edited by Victor H. Moll, was published in 2021.

The book is notable for being the standard reference and textbook for a generation of Cambridge mathematicians including Littlewood and Godfrey H. Hardy. Mary L. Cartwright studied it as preparation for her final honours on the advice of fellow student Vernon C. Morton, later Professor of Mathematics at Aberystwyth University. But its reach was much further than just the Cambridge school; André Weil in his obituary of the French mathematician Jean Delsarte noted that Delsarte always had a copy on his desk. In 1941, the book was included among a "selected list" of mathematical analysis books for use in universities in an article for that purpose published by American Mathematical Monthly.

== Notable features ==
Some idiosyncratic but interesting problems from an older era of the Cambridge Mathematical Tripos are in the exercises.

The book was one of the earliest to use decimal numbering for its sections, an innovation the authors attribute to Giuseppe Peano.

== Contents ==
Below are the contents of the fourth edition:

Part I. The Process of Analysis

1. Complex Numbers
2. The Theory of Convergence
3. Continuous Functions and Uniform Convergence
4. The Theory of Riemann Integration
5. The fundamental properties of Analytic Functions; Taylor's, Laurent's, and Liouville's Theorems
6. The Theory of Residues; application to the evaluation of Definite Integrals
7. The expansion of functions in Infinite Series
8. Asymptotic Expansions and Summable Series
9. Fourier Series and Trigonometrical Series
10. Linear Differential Equations
11. Integral Equations

Part II. The Transcendental Functions

12. The Gamma Function
13. The Zeta Function of Riemann
14. The Hypergeometric Function
15. Legendre Functions
16. The Confluent Hypergeometric Function
17. Bessel Functions
18. The Equations of Mathematical Physics
19. Mathieu Functions
20. Elliptic Functions. General theorems and the Weierstrassian Functions
21. The Theta Functions
22. The Jacobian Elliptic Functions
23. Ellipsoidal Harmonics and Lamé's Equation

== Reception ==
=== Reviews of the first edition ===
George B. Mathews, in a 1903 review article published in The Mathematical Gazette opens by saying the book is "sure of a favorable reception" because of its "attractive account of some of the most valuable and interesting results of recent analysis". He notes that Part I deals mainly with infinite series, focusing on power series and Fourier expansions while including the "elements of" complex integration and the theory of residues. Part II, in contrast, has chapters on the gamma function, Legendre functions, the hypergeometric series, Bessel functions, elliptic functions, and mathematical physics.

Arthur S. Hathaway, in another 1903 review published in the Journal of the American Chemical Society, notes that the book centers around complex analysis, but that topics such as infinite series are "considered in all their phases" along with "all those important series and functions" developed by mathematicians such as Joseph Fourier, Friedrich Bessel, Joseph-Louis Lagrange, Adrien-Marie Legendre, Pierre-Simon Laplace, Carl Friedrich Gauss, Niels Henrik Abel, and others in their respective studies of "practice problems". He goes on to say it "is a useful book for those who wish to make use of the most advanced developments of mathematical analysis in theoretical investigations of physical and chemical questions."

In a third review of the first edition, Maxime Bôcher, in a 1904 review published in the Bulletin of the American Mathematical Society notes that while the book falls short of the "rigor" of French, German, and Italian writers, it is a "gratifying sign of progress to find in an English book such an attempt at rigorous treatment as is here made". He notes that important parts of the book were otherwise non-existent in the English language.

== See also ==
- Bateman Manuscript Project
