= William Zimmerle =

Scholar and archaeologist

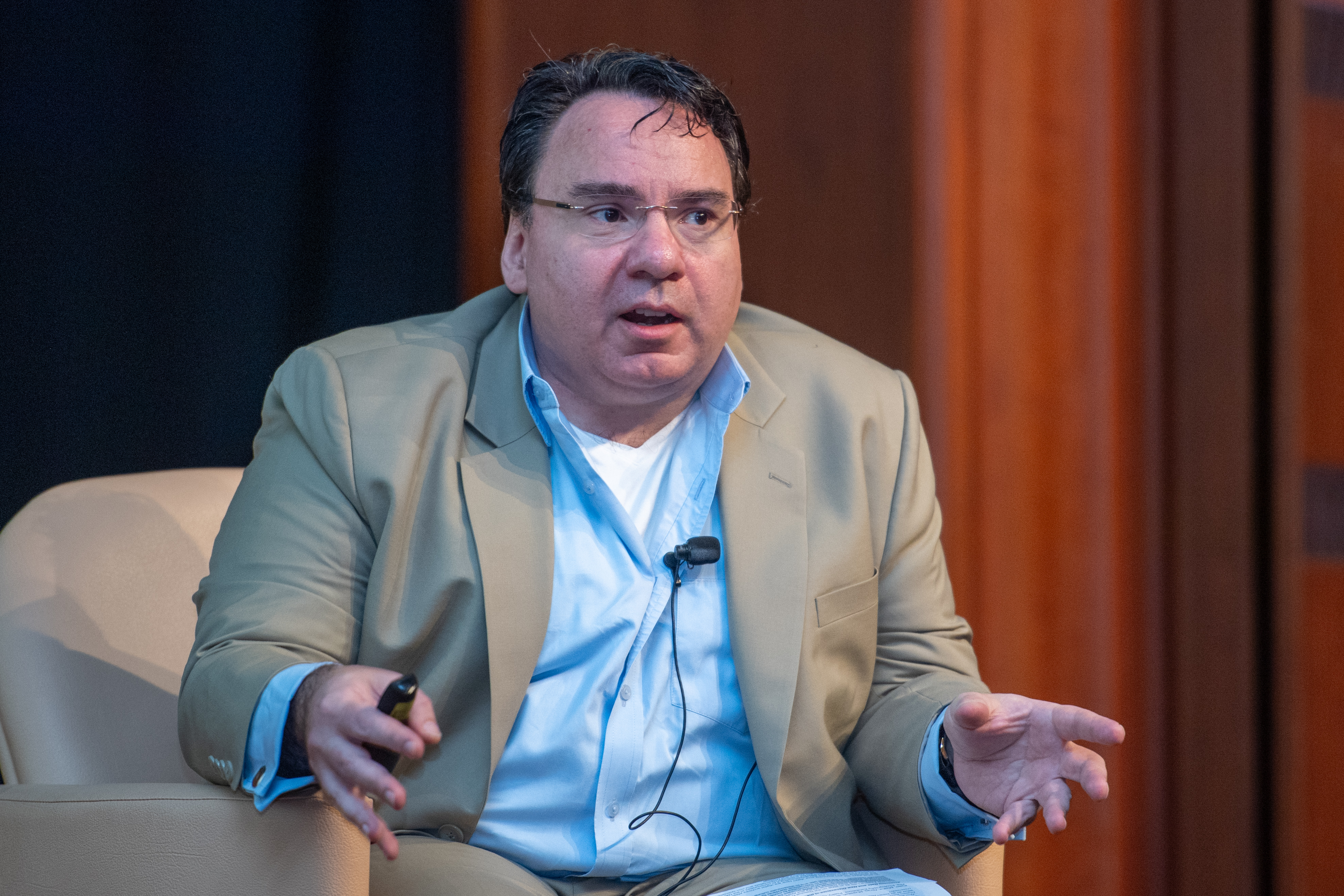
- Zimmerle in 2023 at an event at the National Library & Archives
- Occupations: Scholar and archaeologist

Academic background
- Education: PhD in Near Eastern Languages and Civilizations
- Alma mater: Fairleigh Dickinson University; Harvard University; University of Pennsylvania; University of Edinburgh

Academic work
- Discipline: Digital Humanities, Cultural Heritage, Archaeology, Ancient History, and Religious Studies
- Institutions: New York University Abu Dhabi

William Gerlad Zimmerle is a scholar and archaeologist. He is also the Director of the Dhofar Ethnography Preservation Project and the Dhofar Rock Art & Arabian Inscriptions Project.

He is currently a Senior Lecturer in the Arts & Humanities department at New York University Abu Dhabi (NYUAD).

== Education ==
Zimmerle has a BA degree in History and Anthropology from Fairleigh Dickinson University, a Master of Divinity in Religion and Ancient Languages from Harvard University, a PhD in Near Eastern Languages and Civilization from the University of Pennsylvania, and a PgCert in Intellectual Property Law from the University of Edinburgh.

== Field work ==
He has been cataloging rock art found in cave shelters within the Dhofar region of Oman through photography and writing.

== Publications ==
=== Journal articles ===
- "Recent Advances in Applications of Active Constituents of Selected Medicinal Plants of Dhofar, Sultanate of Oman", in the Asian Journal Of Pharmaceutical And Clinical Research, 2018
- "Ethnographic light on the form, function, and decoration of'Arabian-style'cuboid incense burners from first-millennium BC Nippur", in the Seminar for Arabian Studies, 2014
- "Evidence for the Arabian Spice Trade in the Southern Levant: Incense Altars and Alabaster Jars from the Axial Age (8th-4th Century B.C.E.)", in the W.F. Albright Newsletter Fellow's Report, 2012
- The Impact of Neo-Assyrian Imperialism on Iron Age Jordan in the W.F. Albright Newsletter Fellow's Report, 2011
- "The 2005 Season at Tall Dhiban", in the Annual Department of Antiquities of Jordan, 2010
- "Tall Dhiban Report", in the American Journal of Archaeology, 2008
- "The 2004 Season at Dhiban (Jordan): Prospection, Preservation, and Planning", in the Annual Department of Antiquities of Jordan, 2005

=== Books ===
- Cultural Treasures from the Cave Shelters of Dhofar: Photographs of the Painted Rock Art Heritage of Southern Oman, 2017
- Crafting Cuboid Incense Burners in the Land of Frankincense: The Dhofar Ethnoarchaeology Preservation Project, 2017

=== Book chapters ===
- "Frankincense and its Arabian Burner", in All things Arabia: Arabian Identity and Material Culture
- "The Arabian Incense Burner", in The Gulf in World History: Arabia at the Crossroads, 2018

=== Edited books ===
- "Camel". Encyclopedia of Ancient History, 2012.
- "Ashdod". Encyclopedia of Ancient History, 2012
- "Ezekiel". Encyclopedia of Ancient History. 2012
- "Orontes". Encyclopedia of Ancient History, 2012
- "Red Sea". Encyclopedia of Ancient History, 2012
- "Perfumes and Unguents". Encyclopedia of Ancient History, 2012
- "Ethiopia". Encyclopedia of Ancient History, 2012
