= New York University Abu Dhabi =

Portal campus of New York University in the United Arab Emirates

- Other name: جامعة نيويورك أبوظبي (Arabic)
- Type: Portal campus of New York University
- Established: 2010; 16 years ago
- Vice-Chancellor: Fabio Piano
- Faculty: 320+
- Undergraduates: 2075+
- Postgraduates: 130+
- Location: Abu Dhabi, Emirate of Abu Dhabi, UAE; 24.5240°N 54.4340°E
- Campus: Urban
- Mascot: Desert Falcons
- Website: nyuad.nyu.edu

New York University Abu Dhabi (NYU Abu Dhabi or NYUAD, Arabic: جامعة نيويورك أبوظبي) is a degree-granting portal campus of New York University, established as a private liberal arts college in Abu Dhabi, United Arab Emirates.

Together with the main sites in New York and Shanghai, the portal campus is part of NYU's Global Network University. It started in 2008 as a temporary site for conferences and cultural events. The academic program opened in September 2010 at the university's provisional downtown site. It was moved permanently in 2014 to Saadiyat Island, Abu Dhabi.

The university has produced 25 Rhodes Scholars since its opening in 2010.

== History and background ==
In October 2007, New York University announced its intention to open a complete branch campus in Abu Dhabi, financed by the government of the United Arab Emirates. New York University planned the Abu Dhabi campus, and the funding mainly came from the UAE government.

The school was first opened in 2008 on a site in downtown Abu Dhabi, where it held various public events such as academic conferences, workshops, and performances. Alfred Bloom, former president of Swarthmore College, was appointed to lead NYU Abu Dhabi as vice chancellor in September 2008. NYU Abu Dhabi accepted its first class of 150 students in September 2010. Starting from 2010, the college offered variety of courses in arts and sciences. In the same year, the NYU Abu Dhabi Institute announced the first three research projects supported by NYUAD, with grants totalling 20 million U.S. dollars over a five-year period. The projects covered the humanities, social sciences, natural sciences and engineering. Mariët Westermann, academic administrator and art historian, was appointed as the second Vice Chancellor in August 2019 and served until May 31, 2024. Fabio Piano, Ph.D., Joint Distinguished Professor, NYU Abu Dhabi-NYU New York, Professor of Biology and Director of the Center for Genomics and Systems Biology at NYU in New York, and NYU Abu Dhabi Provost from 2010-2020, was appointed interim Vice Chancellor, effective June 1, 2024.

New York University moved the Abu Dhabi campus to a new site in 2014 in the Marina district of Saadiyat Island. It was designed by Rafael Viñoly, an Uruguayan architect, and built by Al-Futtaim Carillion. The NYU Abu Dhabi Art Gallery was established in 2014 as an on-campus exhibition space for academic and experimental museum exhibitions. The Arts Center at NYUAD opened its inaugural season on the Saadiyat campus in 2015, presenting public performing-arts programming NYU eventually plans to have 2,000 students on campus. The university plans to open a graduate school and make the school a center for research.

Bill Clinton, the 42nd President of the United States, was the keynote speaker at NYU Abu Dhabi's inaugural commencement ceremony for 140 graduates held on May 25, 2014.

In January 2025, NYUAD began its Astrophysics and Space Systems PhD Program.

On 11 February 2025, the NYUAD launched the Stern School of Business with 54 students from 25 countries attending a one-year full-time MBA degree in corporation with NYU Stern and NYU Abu Dhabi.

== Accreditation ==
New York University Abu Dhabi is accredited by the Commission for Academic Accreditation (CAA), the UAE Federal Government's quality assurance agency for higher education. Records from the CAA show that NYUAD received initial approval in January 2010 and initial accreditation for 22 degree programmes in 2012. The university's approval was extended in 2015. NYUAD is also accredited as an additional location of NYU by the Middle States Commission on Higher Education, an institutional accreditation agency recognized by the US Secretary of Education and the Council for Higher Education Accreditation.

The National Association of Schools of Art and Design (NASAD) lists the following programmes at NYU Abu Dhabi: Art History, Art Practice, and the MFA in Art and Media. The initial accreditation was granted on 1 October 2020, and the next review is scheduled to take place between 2025 and 2026.

== Campus and Locations ==
=== Saadiyat Island Campus ===
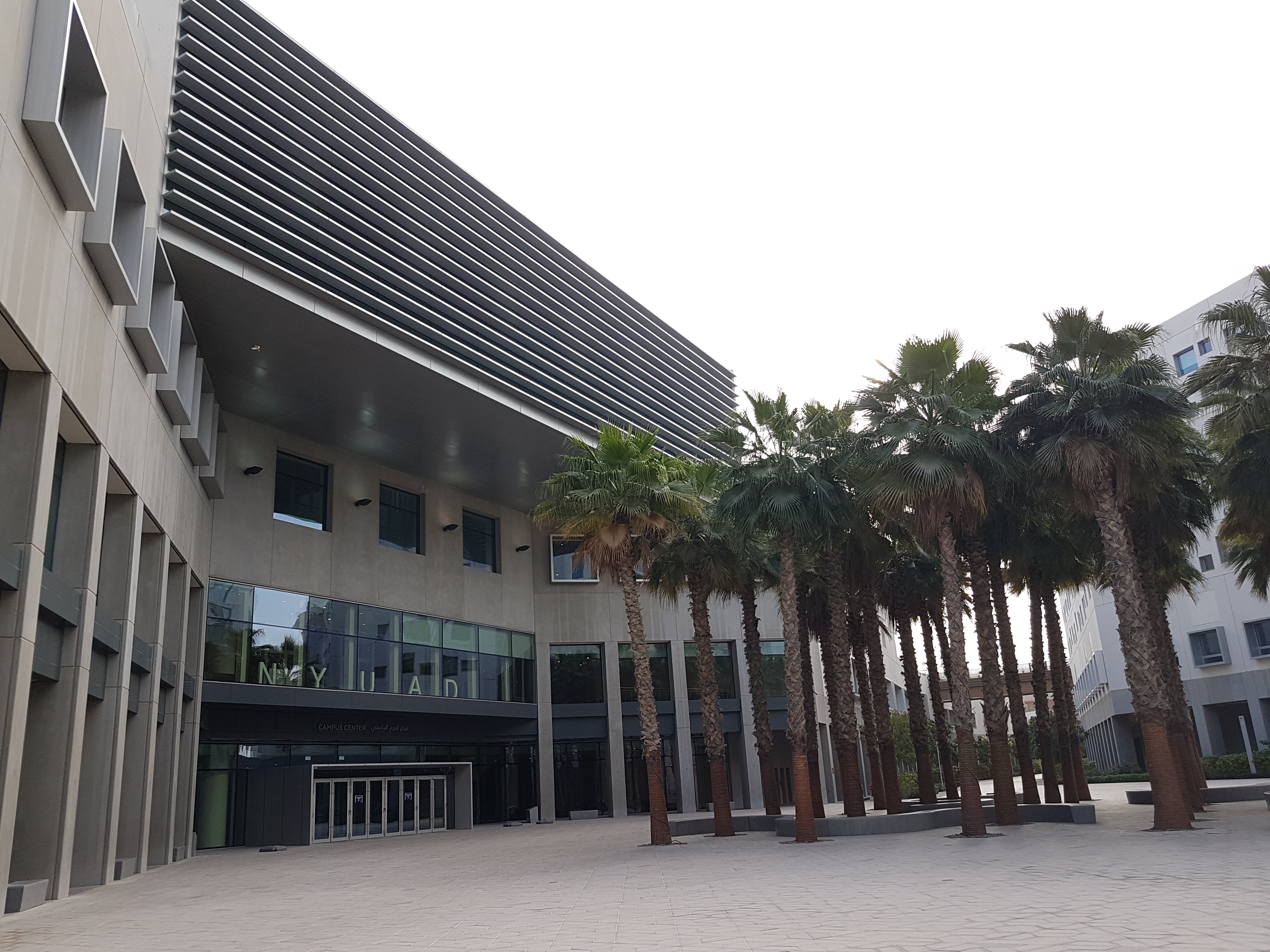
John E. Sexton's square with 36 Palm Trees, which represents the age of the United Arab Emirates in the year of the university's foundation

The campus is located on Saadiyat Island within a cultural district for the city that houses the Louvre Abu Dhabi, the Zayed National Museum, and is also planned to house the Guggenheim Abu Dhabi museum. NYUAD announced that the campus has been awarded the two-pearl Estidama rating in recognition of its design and construction. Architect Rafael Viñoly was named master planner for the campus, designing it to combine elements of NYU's Greenwich Village environment and traditional Islamic villages. The pedestrian campus consists of state-of-the-art classrooms, library, and information technology facilities; laboratories; academic buildings; student dormitories; faculty and residential housing; and athletic and performance facilities. Undergraduate accommodation is organised across three residential buildings, with single and double rooms and shared facilities, as well as residence-based communities. The floors are separated by gender. The campus covers nearly 40 acres and also offers a number of public spaces, including theater and performance halls, an art gallery, conference center, and various retail offerings. The construction costs of the NYUAD Saadiyat Campus were entirely funded by the Abu Dhabi government, as will be the operating costs and any future expansions.

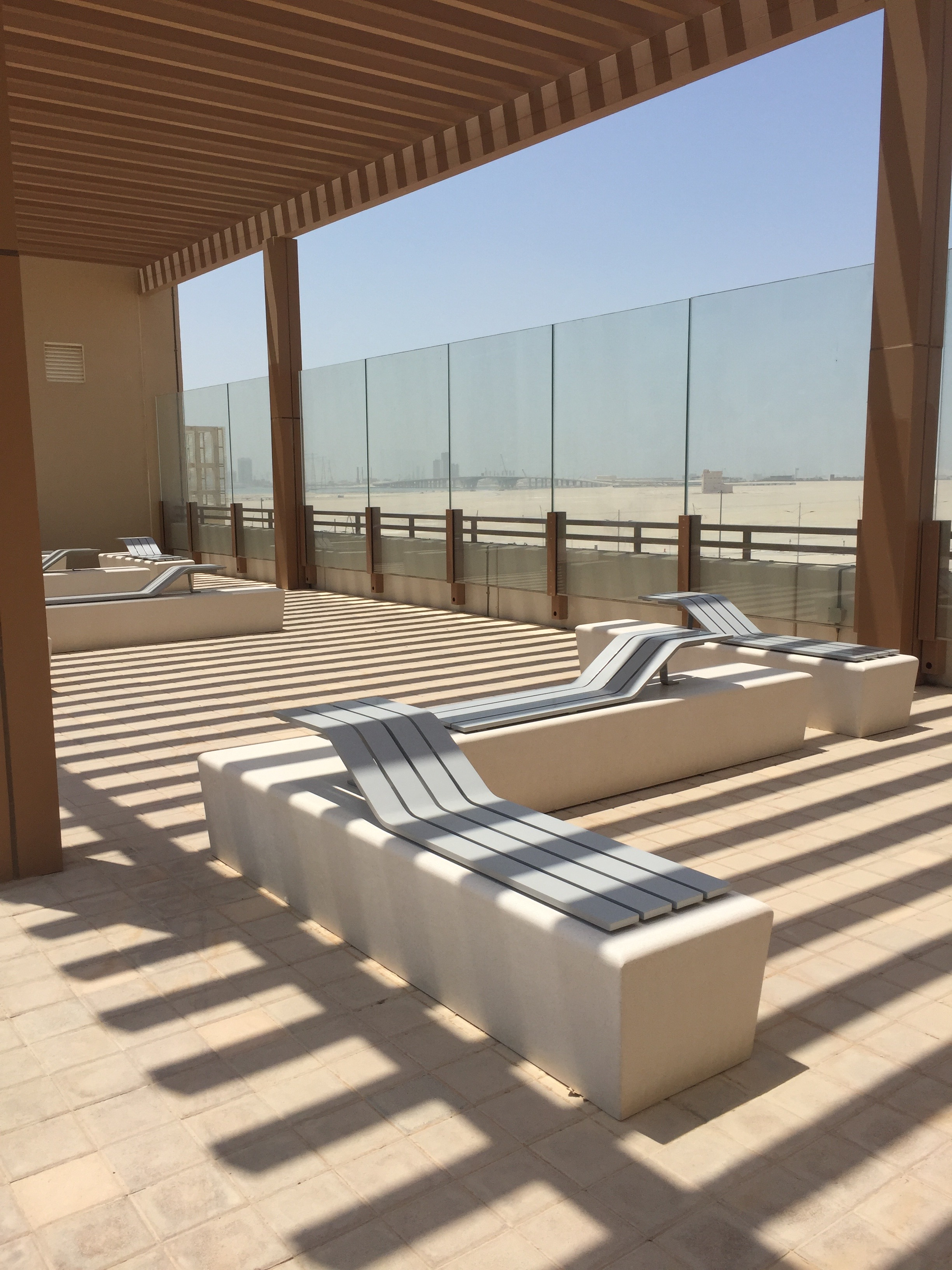
Public space on the NYUAD Highline with views of the Persian Gulf

News reports about abuse of subcontracted foreign construction workers at the beginning of the project revealed the arbitrary withholding of wages, unsafe working conditions and failure of the construction companies to pay recruitment fees to laborers. In December 2013, The Guardian wrote, in a multi-part report, that conditions for the foreign workers at the construction site for the campus amount to modern-day slavery. NYU Abu Dhabi revamped and strengthened its Labor Compliance Program to ensure fair compensation and strict adherence to its supplier code of conduct. The university has strengthened its compliance framework over the years to ensure that suppliers consistently meet its standards.

=== 19 Washington Square North ===
From its location in Greenwich Village, 19 Washington Square North (19 WSN) is the gateway to NYU Abu Dhabi at Washington Square. With a gross 11,400 square-foot, 19 WSN is the academic home for NYUAD students, faculty, and administrators who are living in New York as well as the connection center for the two campuses. Global Network Seminars link students in New York and Abu Dhabi for a shared educational experience. A classroom equipped with videoconference equipment is connected to a similar classroom in Abu Dhabi and enables joint seminars based on exchange and cooperation between NYU students on both campuses. 19 WSN has a media center, conference rooms, classrooms, gallery space, a lounge and office space for NYUAD Staff and Faculty. The historic townhouse, built in 1836, was renovated for this purpose in 2009 by MBB Architects.

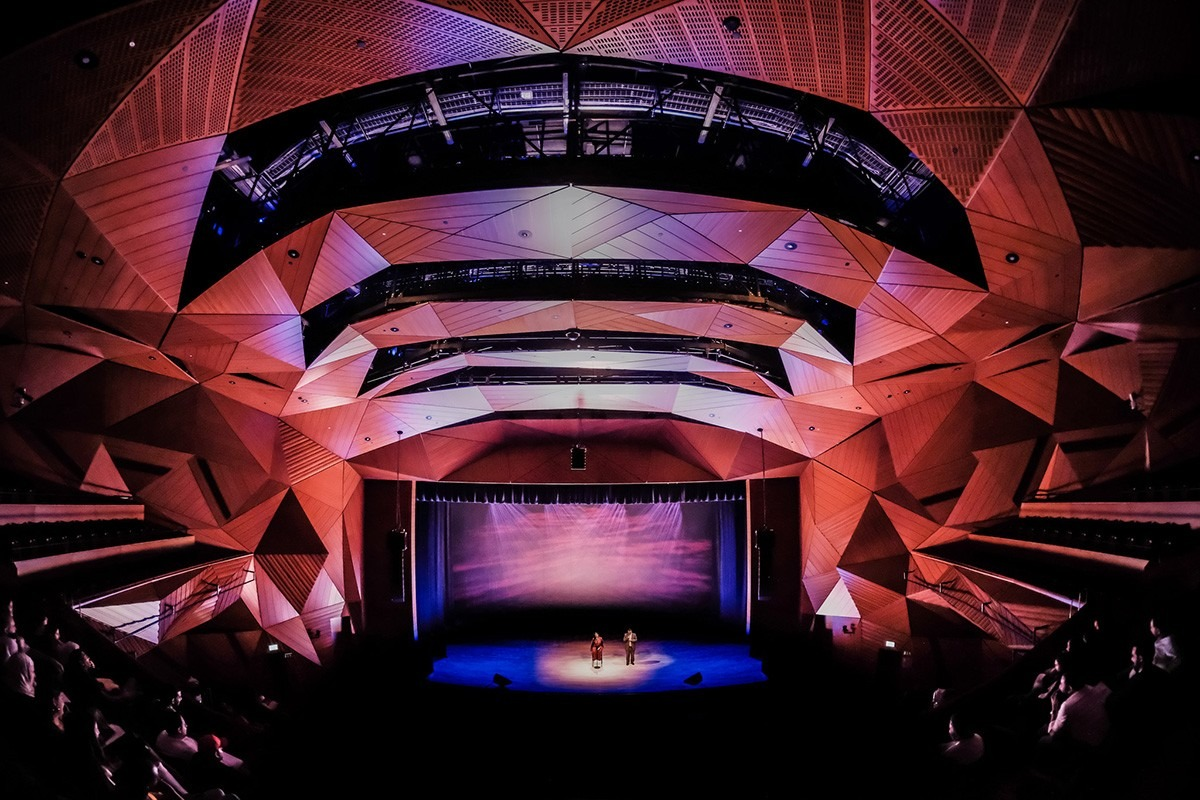
NYUAD Red Theater

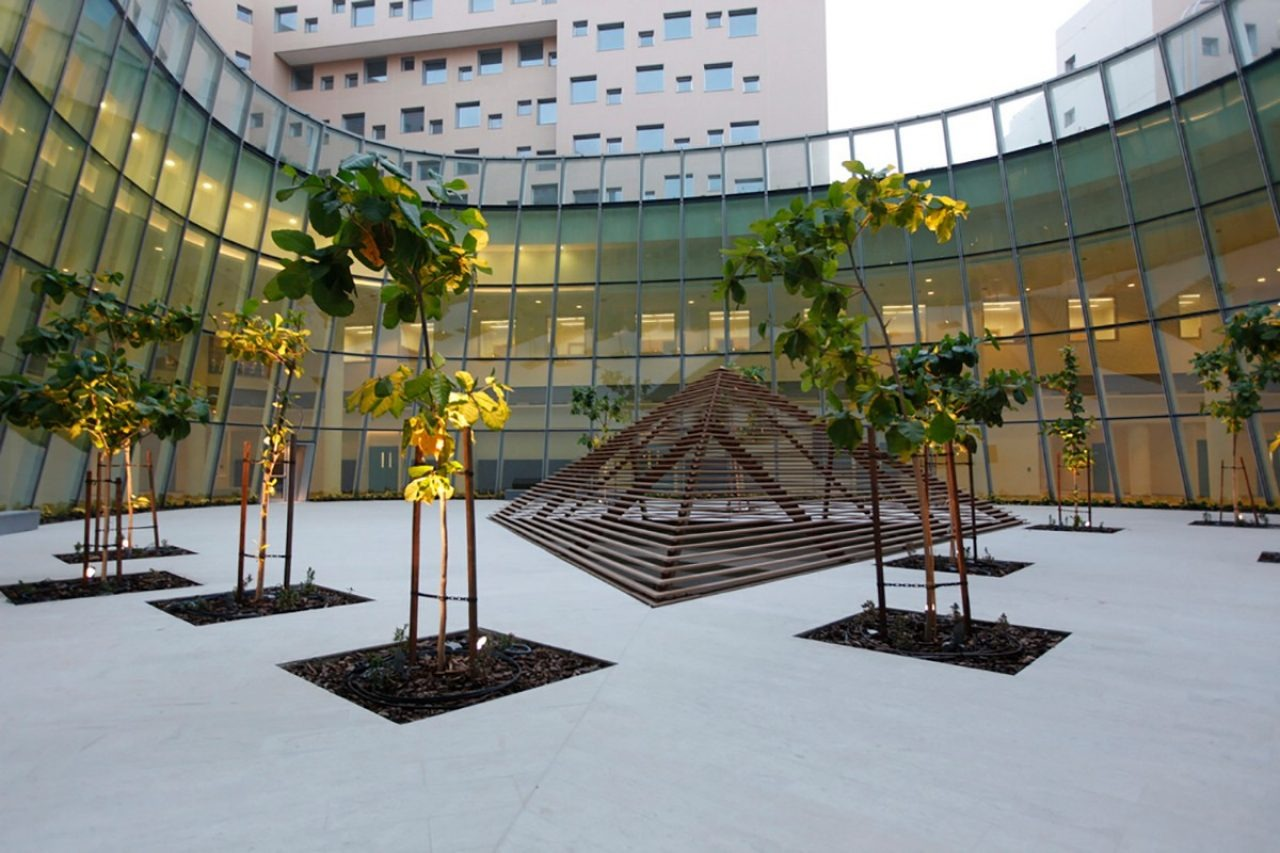
Light Wells

== Academics ==
NYU Abu Dhabi offers 26 majors in the areas of Arts and Humanities, Social Sciences, Science, and Engineering that culminate into a B.A. or B.S. degree. As a prerequisite for graduation, students are required to take courses from the core curriculum, which encompasses topics in world literature, social studies, arts and natural science. Over their college years, undergraduates take three 3-week courses in January (also known as J-Terms) that count toward their graduation requirement. Students' education also includes a capstone project in their senior year. Additionally, students are encouraged to study up to two semesters at New York University's Global Network sites in Accra, Berlin, Buenos Aires, Florence, London, Madrid, New York, Paris, Prague, Shanghai, Tel Aviv, Sydney, and Washington, DC. The university further provides regional study trips within the United Arab Emirates and to countries in Africa, Middle East and Western Asia.

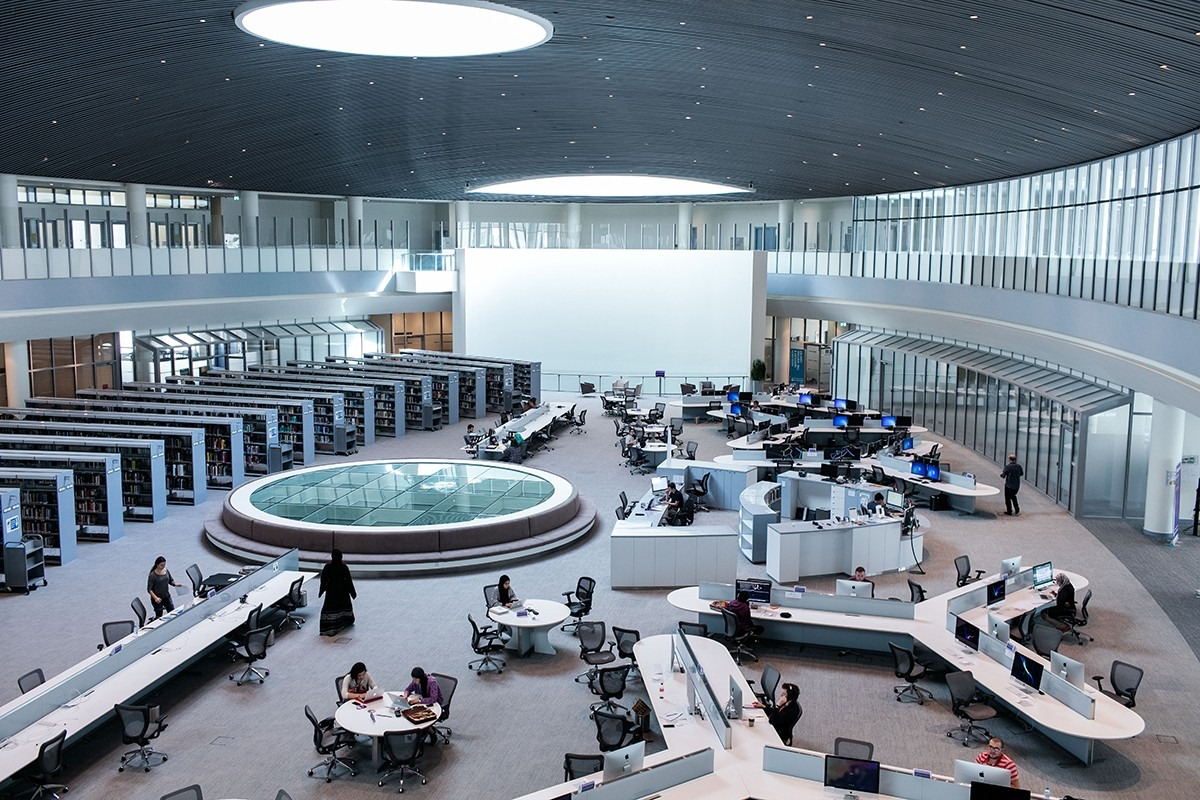
NYU Abu Dhabi's Library

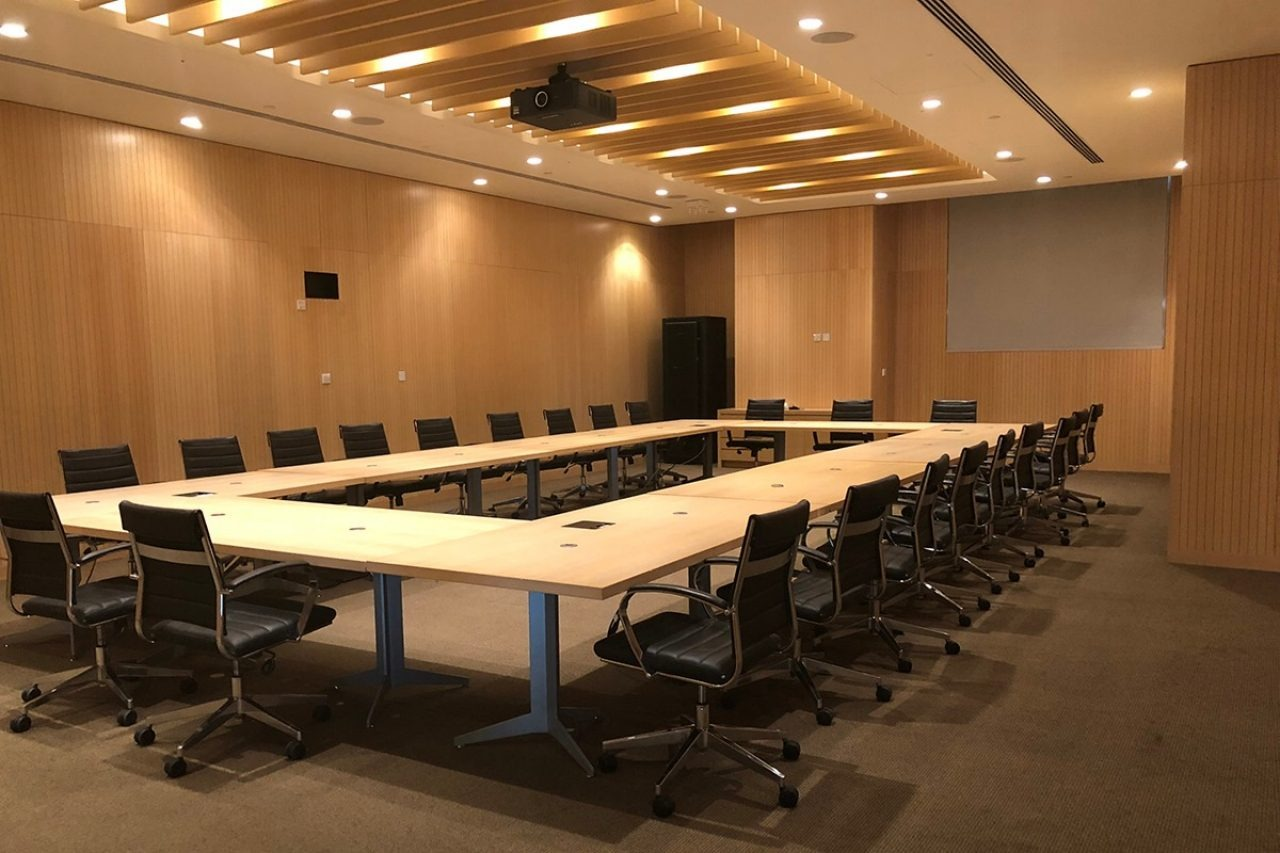
NYU Abu Dhabi's Classroom

Selected graduates of NYU Abu Dhabi will be offered special considerations to enroll at New York University's graduate professional schools and programs.

The university also offers graduate and executive education programs: 11 global PhD fellowship programs and 2 master's programs.

=== Admissions ===
In 2021, the university matriculated 530 new entrants from the Class of 2025 who were selected from more than 17,300 applicants worldwide, an acceptance rate of about 3%.

NYU Abu Dhabi is highly selective. The university has a small and diverse student body, with a total student enrollment of about 2075 in 2024. The first class (class of 2014) consisted of 148 students from 40 countries. The class of 2015 is made up of 161 students from 60 countries. The class of 2016 is made up of 151 students from 65 countries. The class of 2022 is made up of 389 students from 84 countries. The number of applications to NYUAD has grown rapidly, with 15,520 individuals submitting dual NYU Abu Dhabi and NYU New York applications and 2,470 applications with NYUAD as first choice.

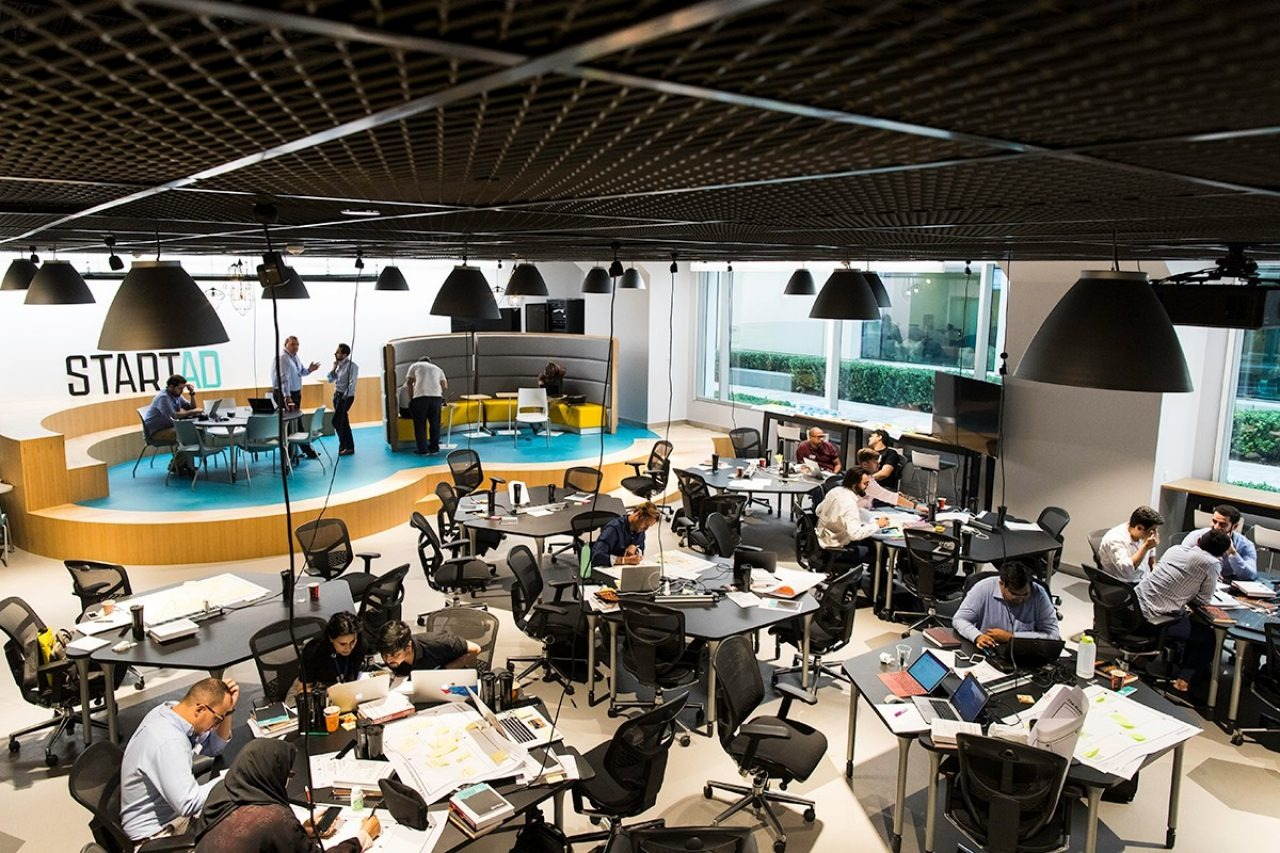
StartAD, the NYUAD's startup accelerator

The university has committed to education accessibility and practises need-blind admissions.

== Student life ==
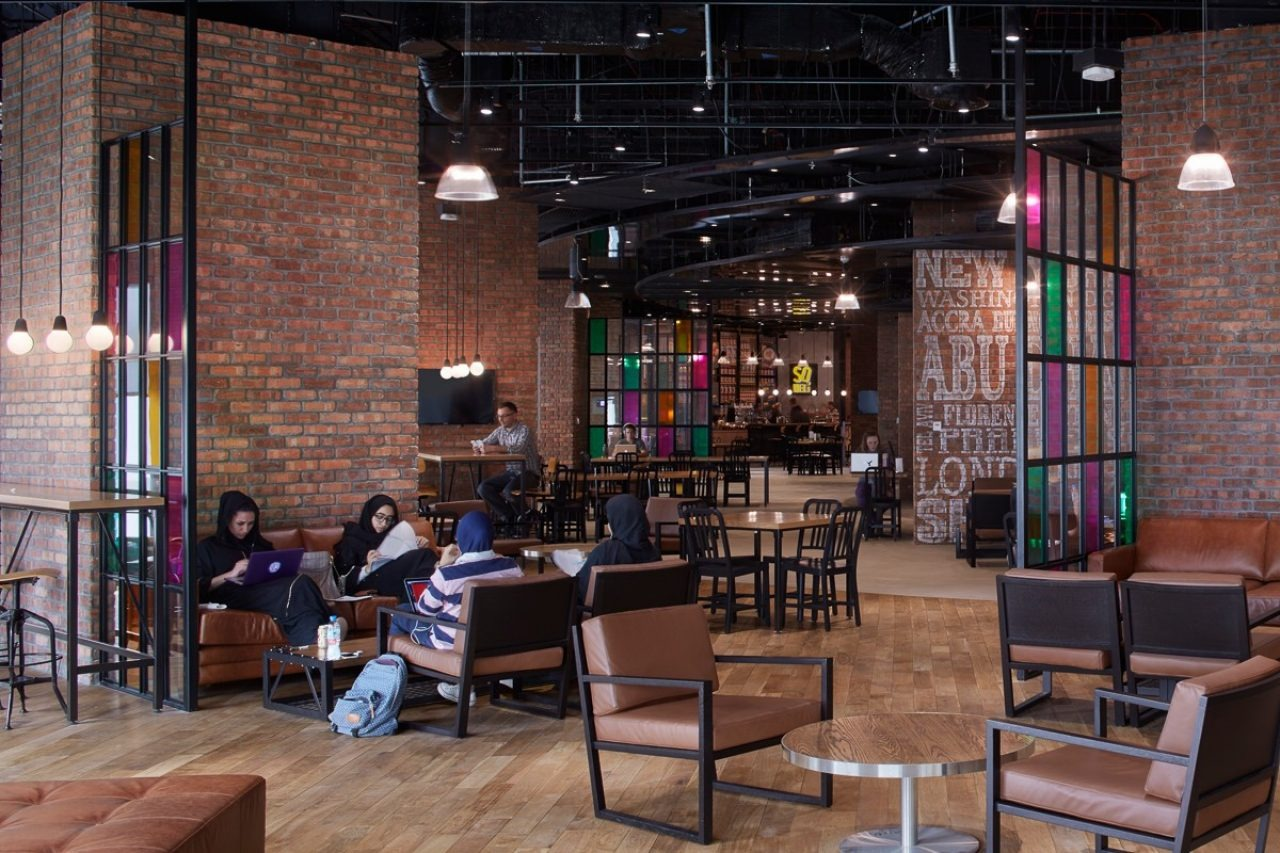
NYUAD Marketplace

NYUAD has over 60 student groups, providing a variety of opportunities for student involvement outside of the classroom. Categories include Academic and Professional; Art, Literature, and Media; Cooking and Food; Culture and Religious; Music and Performance; Outreach and Engagement; Environment and Sustainability; Recreational; Technology; and Sports and Athletics.

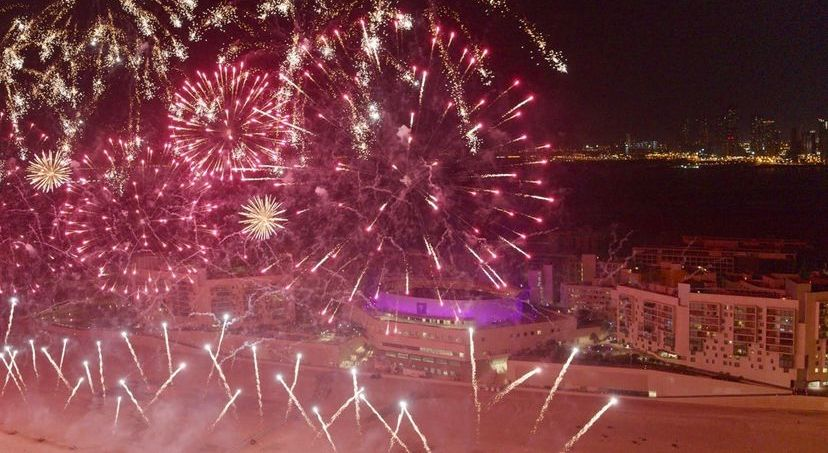
Celebrations on the tenth anniversary of NYU Abu Dhabi

NYUAD also has a weekly student-run newspaper The Gazelle, founded in 2013 by Alistair Blacklock and Amanda Randone.

NYU Abu Dhabi’s Student Government represents undergraduate students and raises issues affecting student life. These include matters relating to academic policies and curricula, as well as campus life policies, services and facilities. The Student Government is divided into the Undergraduate Student Government, which is led by an elected four-member Executive Board, and the Graduate Student Council.

== Athletics and recreation ==
NYU Abu Dhabi is the home of the Desert Falcons sports teams and competes in the Abu Dhabi Inter-University Sports League (ADISL) which runs from October through May and sees competitive play for men's and women's teams against other Abu Dhabi universities in football (soccer), basketball, table tennis, cricket, volleyball, and badminton. The university also has a coed Brazilian Jiu-Jitsu team that boasted competitive performance in several international competitions including Abu Dhabi World Professional Jiu-Jitsu Championship.

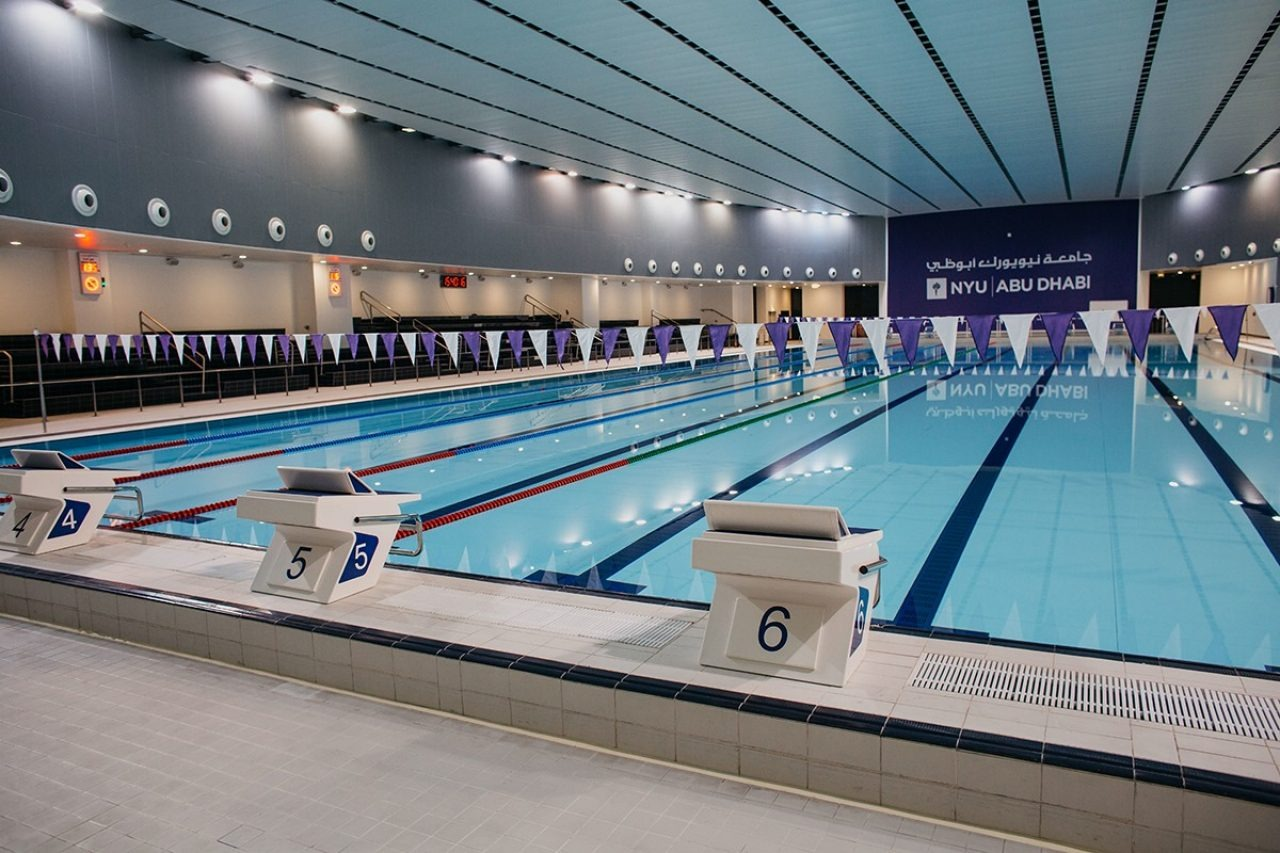
NYU Abu Dhabi's Swimming Pool

NYU Abu Dhabi's campus has modern, competitive level sports and recreation facilities including a 50-meter swimming pool, performance gymnasium and indoor track, fitness center, climbing wall, squash and racquetball courts, football pitch and multi-use fields, an outdoor track, tennis courts, as well as basketball and multi-use courts.

The NYUAD campus was chosen as the venue for both the 2018 MENA Special Olympics Games and the 2019 Special Olympics World Summer Games.

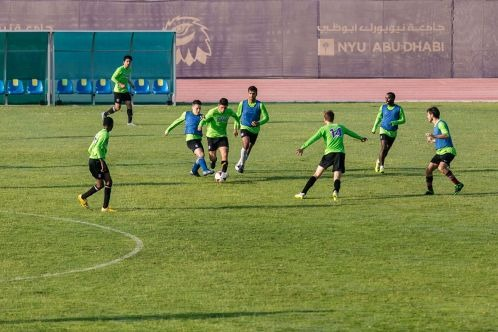
NYU Abu Dhabi's Football Field

== Battle of the Bands at NYUAD ==
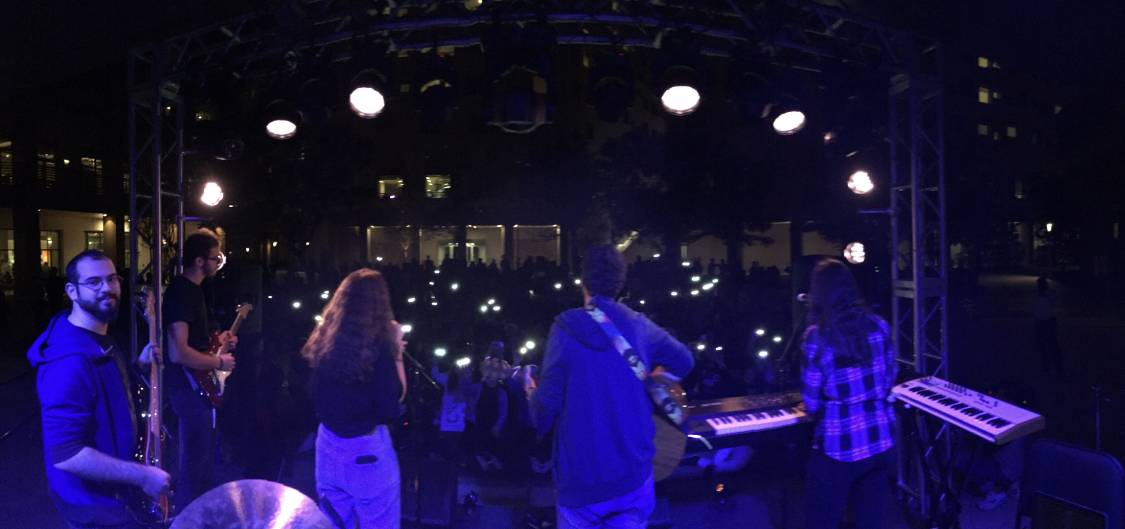
Shaghaf performing at NYUAD's Battle of the Bands in December 2017.

NYU Abu Dhabi started hosting the UAE's first Battle of the Bands competition in early 2017.

== Faculty and research ==
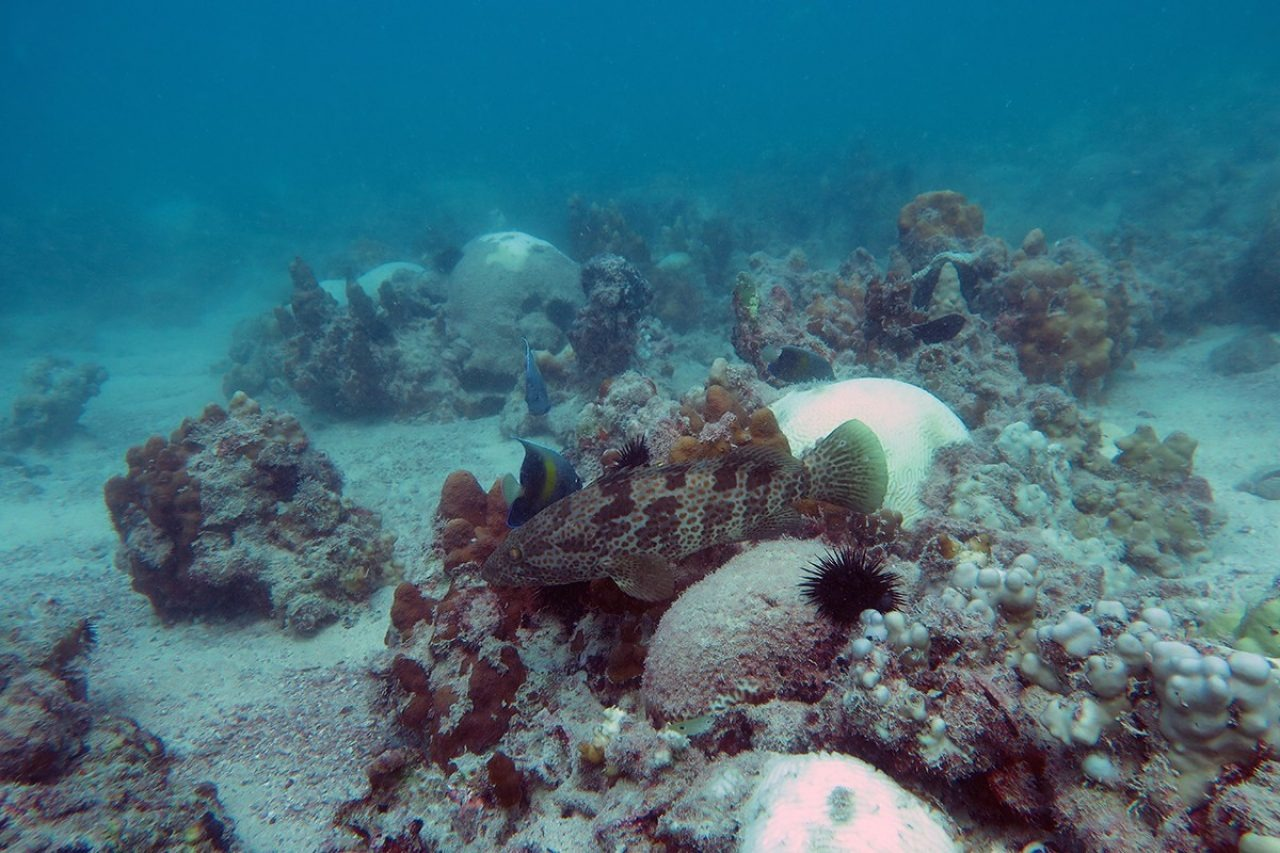
NYU Abu Dhabi's Marine Biology Lab

NYU Abu Dhabi maintains an international faculty and researchers working in the university's facilities.

NYU Abu Dhabi's Library of Arabic Literature (LAL) offers Arabic editions and English translations of significant works of Arabic literature, with an emphasis on the seventh to nineteenth centuries. In its first three years, LAL published nine volumes — on literature, law, religion, biography, and mysticism.

Akkasah Center for Photography at NYU Abu Dhabi collects antique photos from around the Middle East to capture the region's societal transformation over the last century. In its first year, over 12,900 photos were curated.

== Notable faculty ==
Notable current and former faculty include:

- Wole Soyinka, Arts Professor of Theater
- Ouided Bouchamaoui, Professor of Practice of Diplomacy and Conflict Resolution
- Abdulrazak Gurnah, Arts Professor of Literature
- Kwame Anthony Appiah, Professor of Philosophy and Law
- Thomas H. Bender, Professor of History
- Godfried Toussaint, Research Professor of Computer Science
- Elias Khoury, Global Distinguished Professor of Modern Arabic Literature
- Anthony Kronman, Global Professor, New York University Abu Dhabi
- Gregory Pardlo Professor in Creative Writing
- Iván Szelényi, Emeritus Dean of Social Sciences
- Werner Sollors, Global Professor of Literature
- Eugene Trubowitz, Global Professor of Mathematics
- Carol Gilligan, Visiting Professor of Humanities and Applied Psychology
- Kevin O'Rourke, Professor of Economics
- Robert C. Allen, Professor of Economics
- William Zimmerle, Professor of Archaeology
- Ahmed Almheiri, Assistant Professor of Physics, known for his work on the black hole information paradox.

== Notable alumni ==
- Shamma Al Bastaki, Emirati visual artist
- Hamda Al Qubaisi, Emirati motorsports racing driver

== Community programs ==
The Sheikh Mohamed bin Zayed Scholars Program (SMSP) is one of two community programs operated by NYU Abu Dhabi. SMSP is intended for undergraduate students at institutes of higher education in the United Arab Emirates other than New York University Abu Dhabi. The other community program is the NYUAD Summer Academy Program which is open to Abu Dhabi-based high school students entering their 11th year. Recipients take academic courses and receive English training and leadership training. They also travel to the United States to see the university's New York campus.

In 2016, NYUAD and Tamkeen launched startAD, an Abu Dhabi entrepreneurship platform connected to the university with the goal to grant emerging startups access to industry organisations in the UAE, as well as opportunities for business viability testing. The programme runs twice a year, with approximately 10–15 teams participating in each cycle. It is described as a four-month training initiative providing support in the form of seed investment, shared workspaces, mentorship, and legal assistance.

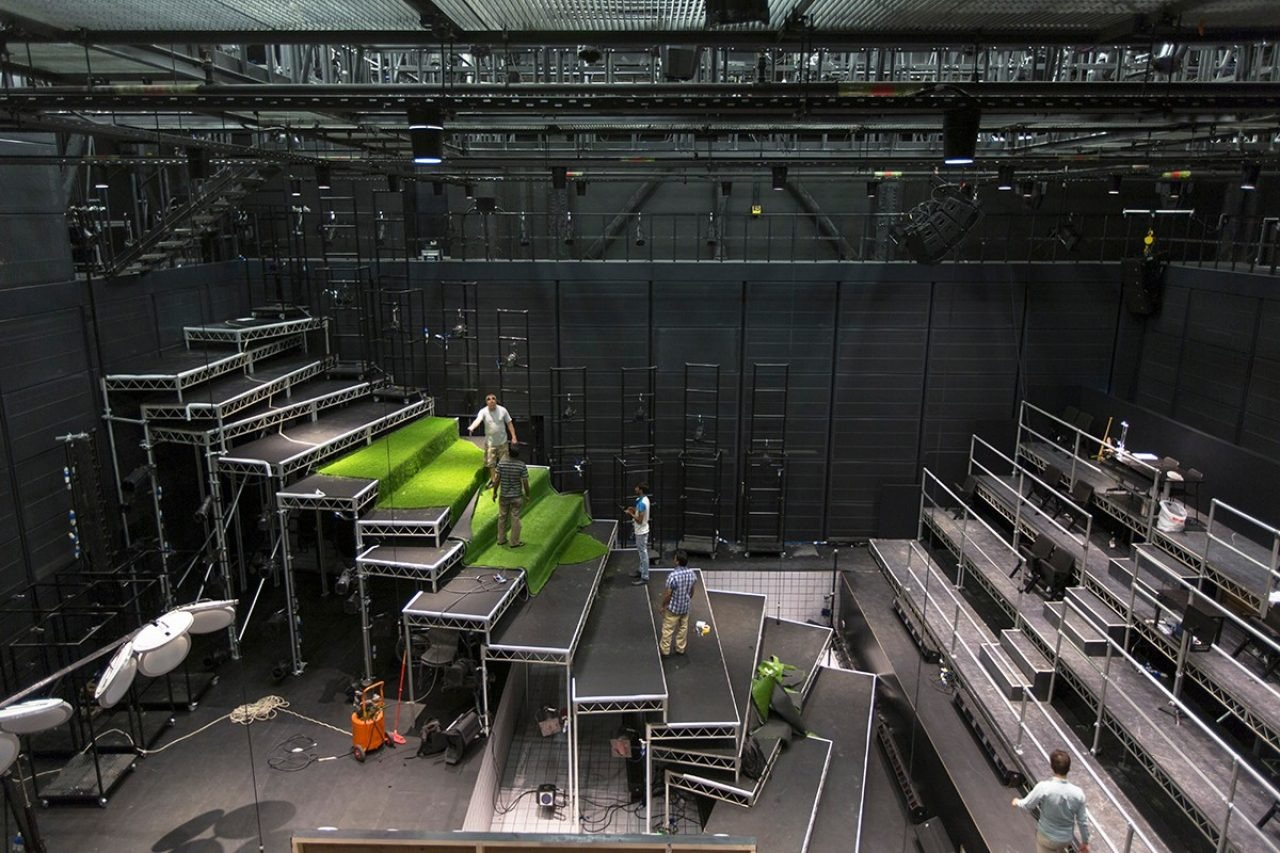
NYUAD Black Box

== Controversies ==
An article appeared in The New York Times regarding labor violations during construction, with subcontracted workers complaining of their passports being confiscated and of being charged a year's wages in advance to work for little money in poor conditions. Such criticisms have been described as "one of the factors at play in a faculty vote of no-confidence in President John Sexton's leadership in 2013 [and] Sexton retiring as president in 2016."

In March 2015, NYU professor Andrew Ross was prevented from boarding a plane to NYU Abu Dhabi, prompting him to decry what he felt was an attack on his academic freedom. As he told Slate magazine, "If someone with my kind of profile and especially my official position ... can be treated this way, what is the value of the protections that are promised for less high-profile faculty in Abu Dhabi? ... My passage to and from the UAE is supposed to be protected, and we've been told by our administration that they have agreements with our Abu Dhabi partners about protecting academic freedoms, and now it turns out that they really don't have that kind of influence."

Additionally, there have been debates about how LGBTQ+ students, Jewish/Israeli students, and other groups of students are treated at NYU Abu Dhabi. For example, as the editorial board of one of NYU's student newspapers wrote, "over the years, many have expressed concerns about discrimination against gay students at NYU Abu Dhabi."

At the May 2024 graduation ceremony, a university student was held into a police custody and deported from the UAE for wearing a Palestinian keffiyeh and shouting “Free Palestine!”. The university restricted pro-Palestinian demonstrations, displaying the Palestinian flag and wearing keffiyeh. Similar incidents affected those students who were looking to buy keffiyeh in bulk as a fundraiser and organize vigils for Gaza. The university was accused of not protecting faculty, staff and students from detentions, interrogations and deportation. NYU said it had no authority over the UAE’s actions and decisions. The university has also faced criticism for balancing American liberal arts education with the UAE's strict speech laws, and for using migrant workers to build the campus under poor conditions. In 2017, NYU's journalism department had also cut ties with NYU Abu Dhabi after the UAE denied visas to two professors.

== See also ==
- Americans in the United Arab Emirates
