= Gradshteyn and Ryzhik =

Table of integrals compiled by I. S. Gradshteyn and I. M. Ryzhik

Table of Integrals, Series, and Products
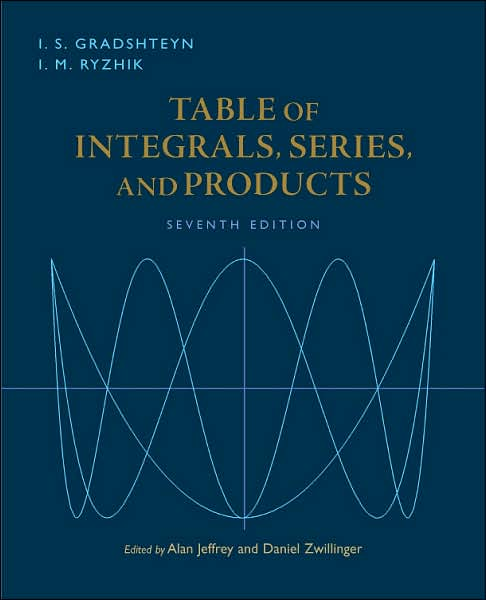
- Gradshteyn and Ryzhik, seventh English edition, 2007
- Author: Ryzhik, Gradshteyn, Geronimus, Tseytlin et al.
- Language: Russian, German, Polish, English, Japanese, Chinese
- Genre: Math
- Publisher: Academic Press
- Publication date: 1943, 2015
- Publication place: Russia

Gradshteyn and Ryzhik (GR) is the informal name of a comprehensive table of integrals originally compiled by the Russian mathematicians I. S. Gradshteyn and I. M. Ryzhik. Its full title today is Table of Integrals, Series, and Products.

Since its first publication in 1943, it was considerably expanded and it soon became a "classic" and highly regarded reference for mathematicians, scientists and engineers. After the deaths of the original authors, the work was maintained and further expanded by other editors.

At some stage a German and English dual-language translation became available, followed by Polish, English-only and Japanese versions. After several further editions, the Russian and German-English versions went out of print and have not been updated after the fall of the Iron Curtain, but the English version is still being actively maintained and refined by new editors, and it has recently been retranslated back into Russian as well.

== Overview ==
One of the valuable characteristics of Gradshteyn and Ryzhik compared to similar compilations is that most listed integrals are referenced. The literature list contains 92 main entries and 140 additional entries (in the eighth English edition). The integrals are classified by numbers, which haven't changed from the fourth Russian up to the seventh English edition (the numbering in older editions as well as in the eighth English edition is not fully compatible). The book does not only contain the integrals, but also lists additional properties and related special functions. It also includes tables for integral transforms. Another advantage of Gradshteyn and Ryzhik compared to computer algebra systems is the fact that all special functions and constants used in the evaluation of the integrals are listed in a registry as well, thereby allowing reverse lookup of integrals based on special functions or constants.

On the downsides, Gradshteyn and Ryzhik has become known to contain a relatively high number of typographical errors even in newer editions, which has repeatedly led to the publication of extensive errata lists. Earlier English editions were also criticized for their poor translation of mathematical terms and mediocre print quality.

== History ==
The work was originally compiled by the Russian mathematicians Iosif Moiseevich Ryzhik (Russian: Иосиф Моисеевич Рыжик, German: Jossif Moissejewitsch Ryschik) (Note: Iosif Moiseevich Ryzhik (Иосиф Моисеевич Рыжик) (1918?–1941?). VIAF 15286520. GND 107340518, 1087809320. (NB. Some sources identify him as a sergeant (сержантом) born in 1918, originally from Vitebsk (Витебска), who was drafted into the army in 1939 from Chkalovsk (Чкаловска), Orenburg (Оренбург), and got missing in December 1941. However, since a birth year 1918 would have made him a very young author (18), this could also have been a namesake. In the foreword of the first edition of the book, Ryzhik thanked three mathematicians of the Moscow Mathematical Society for their suggestions and advice: Vyacheslav Vassilievich Stepanov (Вячеслав Васильевич Степанов), Aleksei Ivanovich Markushevich (Алексей Иванович Маркушевич), and Ilya Nikolaevich Bronshtein (Илья Николаевич Бронштейн), suggesting that he must have been in some way associated with this group.)) and Izrail Solomonovich Gradshteyn (Russian: Израиль Соломонович Градштейн, German: Israil Solomonowitsch Gradstein). (Note: Izrail Solomonovich Gradshteyn (Израиль Соломонович Градштейн) (1899, Odessa – 1958, Moscow). VIAF 20405466, VIAF 310677818, VIAF 270418384. ISNI 0000000116049405. GND 11526194X.) While some contents were original, significant portions were collected from other previously existing integral tables like David Bierens de Haan's Nouvelles tables d'intégrales définies (1867), Václav Jan Láska's Sammlung von Formeln der reinen und angewandten Mathematik (1888–1894) or Edwin Plimpton Adams' and Richard Lionel Hippisley's Smithsonian Mathematical Formulae and Tables of Elliptic Functions (1922).

The first edition, which contained about 5 000 formulas, (Note: Following the sources, this article distinguishes between the documented number of formulas and the number of entries.) was authored by Ryzhik, who had already published a book on special functions in 1936 and died during World War II around 1941. Not announcing this fact, his compilation was published posthumously in 1943, followed by a second corrected edition in his name in 1948. (Note: The fact that Ryzhik's death was not announced before the third edition of the book in 1951 might indicate that his status was unclear for a number of years, or, in the case of the first edition, that typesetting had already started, but actual production of the book had to be delayed and was then finalized in his absence as a consequence of the war.)

The third edition (1951) was worked on by Gradshteyn, who also introduced the chapter numbering system in decimal notation. Gradshteyn planned considerable expansion for the fourth edition, a work he could not finish due to his own death. Therefore, the fourth (1962/1963) and fifth (1971) editions were continued by Yuri Veniaminovich Geronimus (Russian: Юрий Вениаминович Геронимус, German: Juri Weniaminowitsch Geronimus) (Note: Yuri Veniaminovich Geronimus (Юрий Венеаминович Геронимус) (1923–2013), GND 131451812.) and Michail Yulyevich Tseytlin (Russian: Михаил Ю́льевич Цейтлин, German: Michael Juljewitsch Zeitlin). (Note: Michail Yulyevich Tseytlin (Михаил Ю́льевич Цейтлин), also as M. Yu. Ceitlin, Michael Juljewitsch Zeitlin, Michael Juljewitsch Zeitlein, Michael Juljewitsch Tseitlin, Mikhail Juljewitsch Tseitlin (?–).) The fourth edition contained about 12 000 formulas already.

Based on the third Russian edition, the first German-English edition with 5 400 formulas was published in 1957 by the East-German Deutscher Verlag der Wissenschaften (DVW) with German translations by Christa (Note: Christa Berg née Jahncke (?–), GND 122341597 (this entry contains an incorrect birth year and some incorrectly associated books).) and Lothar Berg (Note: Lothar Berg (1930-07-28 to 2015-07-27), GND 117708054.) and the English texts by Martin Strauss. (Note: Martin D. H. Strauss also as Martin D. H. Strauß (1907-03-18 Pillau, Baltijsk, Ostpreußen – 1978-05-17, East-Berlin, GDR), GND 139569200, German physicist and philosopher.) In Zentralblatt für Mathematik Karl Prachar wrote:

"Die sehr reichhaltigen Tafeln wurden nur aus dem Russischen ins Deutsche und Englische übersetzt."
(Translation: The very comprehensive tables were only translated into German and English language.)

In 1963, it was followed by the second edition, a reprint edition with a four-page inlet listing corrections compiled by Eldon Robert Hansen.

Derived from the 1963 edition, but considerably expanded and split into two volumes, the third German-English edition by Ludwig Boll (Note: Ludwig Boll (1911-12-10 Gaulsheim, Germany – 1984-12-02), GND 1068090308, German mathematician.) was finally published by MIR Moscow in 1981 (with permission of DVW and distributed through Verlag Harri Deutsch in the Western world); it incorporated the material of the fifth Russian edition (1971) as well. (Note: The seventh Russian edition (2011) was named after the seventh English edition (2007), of which it was a retranslation. There was no sixth genuinely Russian edition. The English series of editions was originally (1965) based on the fourth Russian edition (1962/1963). It is unknown if any changes for the fifth Russian edition (1971) or the third German-English edition (1981), which did incorporate material from the fifth Russian edition, were reflected in any of the English editions in between (and thereby in the seventh Russian edition as well).)

Pending this third German-English edition an English-only edition by Alan Jeffrey (Note: Alan Jeffrey (1929-07-16 to 2010-06-06), GND 113118120.) was published in 1965. Lacking a clear designation by itself it was variously known as first, third or fourth English edition, as it was based on the then-current fourth Russian edition. The formulas were photographically reproduced and the text translated. This still held true for the expanded fourth English edition in 1980, which added chapters 10 to 17.

Both of these editions saw multiple print runs each incorporating newly found corrections. Starting with the third printing, updated table entries were marked by adding a small superscript number to the entry number indicating the corresponding print run ("3" etc.), a convention carried over into later editions by continuing to increase the superscript number as kind of a revision number (no longer directly corresponding with actual print runs).

The fifth edition (1994), which contained close to 20 000 formulas, was electronically reset in preparation for a CD-ROM issue of the fifth edition (1996) and in anticipation of further editions. Since the sixth edition (2000), now corresponding with superscript number "10", Daniel Zwillinger (Note: Daniel "Dan" Ian Zwillinger (1957–), GND 172475694.) started contributing as well. The last edition being edited by Jeffrey before his death was the seventh English edition published in 2007 (with superscript number "11"). This edition has been retranslated back into Russian as "seventh Russian edition" in 2011.

For the eighth edition (2014/2015, with superscript number "12") Zwillinger took over the role of the editor. He was assisted by Victor Hugo Moll. (Note: Victor Hugo Moll (1956–), GND 173099572.) In order to make room for additional information without increasing the size of the book significantly, the former chapters 11 (on algebraic inequalities), chapters 13 to 16 (on matrices and related results, determinants, norms, ordinary differential equations) and chapter 18 (on z-transforms) worth about 50 pages in total were removed and some chapters renumbered (12 to 11, 17 to 12). This edition contains more than 10 000 entries.

== Related projects ==
In 1995, Alan Jeffrey published his Handbook of Mathematical Formulas and Integrals. It was partially based on the fifth English edition of Gradshteyn and Ryzhik's Table of Integrals, Series, and Products and meant as a companion, but written to be more accessible for students and practitioners. It went through four editions up to 2008. The fourth edition also took advantage of changes incorporated into the seventh English edition of Gradshteyn and Ryzhik.

Inspired by a 1988 paper in which Ilan Vardi proved several integrals in Gradshteyn and Ryzhik, Victor Hugo Moll with George Boros started a project to prove all integrals listed in Gradshteyn and Ryzhik and add additional commentary and references. In the foreword of the book Irresistible Integrals (2004), they wrote:

It took a short time to realize that this task was monumental.

Nevertheless, the efforts have meanwhile resulted in about 900 entries from Gradshteyn and Ryzhik discussed in a series of more than 30 articles of which papers 1 to 28 have been published in issues 14 to 26 of Scientia, Universidad Técnica Federico Santa María (UTFSM), between 2007 and 2015 and compiled into a two-volume book series Special Integrals of Gradshteyn and Ryzhik: the Proofs (2014–2015) already.

== Editions ==
=== Russian editions ===
- Рыжик, И. М. (1943). Таблицы интегралов, сумм, рядов и произведений [Tables of integrals, sums, series and products] (in Russian) (1 ed.). Moscow: Gosudarstvennoe Izdatel'stvo Tehniko-Teoretičeskoj Literatury (Государственное издательство технико-теоретической литературы) (GITTL / ГИТТЛ) (Tehteoretizdat / Техтеоретиздат). LCCN ltf89006085. 400 pages.
- Рыжик, И. М. (1948). Таблицы интегралов, сумм, рядов и произведений (in Russian) (2 ed.). Moscow: Gosudarstvennoe Izdatel'stvo Tehniko-Teoretičeskoj Literatury (Государственное издательство технико-теоретической литературы) (GITTL / ГИТТЛ) (Tehteoretizdat / Техтеоретиздат). 400 pages.
- Рыжик, И. М.; Градштейн, И. С. (1951). Таблицы интегралов, сумм, рядов и произведений (in Russian) (3 ed.). Moscow: Gosudarstvennoe Izdatel'stvo Tehniko-Teoretičeskoj Literatury (Государственное издательство технико-теоретической литературы) (GITTL / ГИТТЛ) (Tehteoretizdat / Техтеоретиздат). LCCN 52034158. 464 pages (+ errata inlet).
- Градштейн, И. С.; Рыжик, И. М. (1963) [1962]. Геронимус, Ю. В.; Цейтлин, М. Ю́. (eds.). Tablitsy Integralov, Summ, Riadov I Proizvedenii Таблицы интегралов, сумм, рядов и произведений (in Russian) (4 ed.). Moscow: Gosudarstvennoe Izdatel'stvo Fiziko-Matematicheskoy Literatury (Государственное издательство физико-математической литературы) (Fizmatgiz / Физматгиз). LCCN 63027211. 1100 pages (+ 8 page errata inlet in later print runs). Errata:
- Градштейн, И. С.; Рыжик, И. М. (1971). Геронимус, Ю. В.; Цейтлин, М. Ю́. (eds.). Таблицы интегралов, сумм, рядов и произведений (in Russian) (5 ed.). Nauka (Наука). LCCN 78876185. Dark brown fake-leather, 1108 pages.
- Градштейн, И. С.; Рыжик, И. М.; Геронимус, Ю. В.; Цейтлин, М. Ю́. (2011). Jeffrey, Alan; Zwillinger, Daniel (eds.). Таблицы интегралов, ряда и продуктов [Table of Integrals, Series, and Products] (in Russian). Translated by Maximov, Vasily Vasilyevich [in Russian] (7 ed.). Saint-Petersburg, Russia: BHV (БХВ-Петербург). ISBN 978-5-9775-0360-0. GR:11. l+1182 pages.

=== German editions ===
- Ryshik, Jossif Moissejewitsch; Gradstein, Israil Solomonowitsch (1957). Tafeln / Tables: Summen-, Produkt- und Integral-Tafeln / Tables of Series, Products, and Integrals (in German and English). Translated by Berg, Christa; Berg, Lothar; Strauss, Martin. Foreword by Schröder, Kurt Erich (1 ed.). Berlin, German Democratic Republic: Deutscher Verlag der Wissenschaften. LCCN 58028629. DNB-IDN 454242255, Lizenz-Nr. 206, 435/2/57. Gray or green linen, xxiii+438 pages. Errata:
- Ryshik, Jossif Moissejewitsch; Gradstein, Israil Solomonowitsch (1963). Tafeln / Tables: Summen-, Produkt- und Integral-Tafeln / Tables of Series, Products, and Integrals (in German and English). Translated by Berg, Christa; Berg, Lothar; Strauss, Martin. Foreword by Schröder, Kurt Erich (2nd corrected ed.). Berlin, German Democratic Republic: VEB Deutscher Verlag der Wissenschaften (DVW). LCCN 63025905. DNB-IDN 579497747, Lizenz-Nr. 206, 435/93/63. (Printed by VEB Druckerei "Thomas Müntzer", Bad Langensalza. Distributed in the USA by Plenum Press, Inc., New York.) Green linen, xxiii+438 pages + 4 page errata inlet. Errata:
- Cover of third German-English edition, 1981
  Gradstein, Israil Solomonowitsch; Ryshik, Jossif Moissejewitsch (1981). Geronimus, Juri Weneaminowitsch; Zeitlin, Michael Juljewitsch (eds.). Tafeln / Tables: Summen-, Produkt- und Integraltafeln / Tables of Series, Products, and Integrals (in German and English). Translated by Boll, Ludwig (3 ed.). Berlin / Thun / Frankfurt am Main / Moscow: Verlag Harri Deutsch / Verlag MIR Moscow. ISBN 3-87144-350-6. LCCN 82202345. DNB-IDN 551448512, 881086274, 881086282. Gray linen with gilded embossing by A. W. Schipow, 2 volumes, 677+3 & 504 pages.

=== Polish edition ===
- Ryżyk, I. M.; Gradsztejn, I. S. (1964). Tablice całek, sum, szeregów i iloczynów (in Polish). Translated by Malesiński, Roman (1 ed.). Warsaw, Poland: Państwowe Wydawnictwo Naukowe (PWN). OCLC 749996828. VIAF 309184374. Light grayish cover, 464 pages.

=== English editions ===
- Gradshteyn, Izrail Solomonovich; Ryzhik, Iosif Moiseevich; Geronimus, Yuri Veniaminovich; Tseytlin, Michail Yulyevich (February 1966) [1965]. Jeffrey, Alan (ed.). Table of Integrals, Series, and Products. Translated by Scripta Technica, Inc. (3 ed.). Academic Press. ISBN 0-12-294750-9. LCCN 65029097. Black cloth hardcover with gilt titles, white dust jacket, xiv+1086 pages. Errata:
- Gradshteyn, Izrail Solomonovich; Ryzhik, Iosif Moiseevich; Geronimus, Yuri Veniaminovich; Tseytlin, Michail Yulyevich (1980). Jeffrey, Alan (ed.). Table of Integrals, Series, and Products. Translated by Scripta Technica, Inc. (4th corrected and enlarged ed.). Academic Press, Inc. ISBN 978-0-12-294760-5. GR:4,5,6,7. xlvi+1160 pages. Errata:
- Cover of fifth English edition, 1994
  Gradshteyn, Izrail Solomonovich; Ryzhik, Iosif Moiseevich; Geronimus, Yuri Veniaminovich; Tseytlin, Michail Yulyevich (January 1994). Jeffrey, Alan (ed.). Table of Integrals, Series, and Products. Translated by Scripta Technica, Inc. (5 ed.). Academic Press, Inc. MR 1243179. Blue hardcover with green or blue rectangular and gilt titles, xlvii+1204 pages. (A CD-ROM version with ISBN 0-12-294756-8 / ISBN 978-0-12-294756-8 and LCCN 96-801532 was prepared by Lightbinders, Inc. in July 1996.) Errata:
- Cover of sixth English edition, 2000
  Gradshteyn, Izrail Solomonovich; Ryzhik, Iosif Moiseevich; Geronimus, Yuri Veniaminovich; Tseytlin, Michail Yulyevich (July 2000). Jeffrey, Alan; Zwillinger, Daniel (eds.). Table of Integrals, Series, and Products. Translated by Scripta Technica, Inc. (6 ed.). Academic Press, Inc. ISBN 978-0-12-294757-5. MR 1773820. GR:10. Red cover, xlvii+1163 pages. (A reprint edition "积分, 级数和乘积表" by World Books Press became available in China under ISBN 7-5062-6546-X / ISBN 978-7-5062-6546-1 in April 2004.) Errata:
- Gradshteyn, Izrail Solomonovich; Ryzhik, Iosif Moiseevich; Geronimus, Yuri Veniaminovich; Tseytlin, Michail Yulyevich (February 2007). Jeffrey, Alan; Zwillinger, Daniel (eds.). Table of Integrals, Series, and Products. Translated by Scripta Technica, Inc. (7 ed.). Academic Press, Inc. ISBN 978-0-12-373637-6. MR 2360010. GR:11. xlviii+1171 pages, with CD-ROM. (A reprint edition "积分, 级数和乘积表" by Beijing World Publishing Corporation (世界图书出版公司北京公司 / WPCBJ) became available in China under ISBN 7-5062-8235-6 / ISBN 978-7-5062-8235-2 in May 2007.) Errata:
- Gradshteyn, Izrail Solomonovich; Ryzhik, Iosif Moiseevich; Geronimus, Yuri Veniaminovich; Tseytlin, Michail Yulyevich; Jeffrey, Alan (2015) [October 2014]. Zwillinger, Daniel; Moll, Victor Hugo (eds.). Table of Integrals, Series, and Products. Translated by Scripta Technica (8 ed.). Academic Press, Inc. ISBN 978-0-12-384933-5. GR:12. xlvi+1133 pages. Errata:

=== Japanese edition ===
- Градштейн (Guradoshu グラドシュ), И. С.; Рыжик (Rijiku リジク), И. М. (December 1983). Sūgaku daikōshikishū 数学大公式集 [Large collection of mathematical formulae] (in Japanese). Translated by Otsuki, Yoshihiko (大槻 義彦) [in Japanese] (1 ed.). Tokyo, Japan: Maruzen (丸善). ISBN 978-4-621-02796-7. NCID BN00561932. JPNO JP84018271. Archived from the original on 2016-04-16. xv+1085 pages.

== See also ==
- Bateman Manuscript Project
- Prudnikov, Brychkov and Marichev (PBM)
- Bronshtein and Semendyayev (BS)
- Abramowitz and Stegun (AS)
- NIST Handbook of Mathematical Functions (DLMF)
- Jahnke and Emde (JE)
- Magnus and Oberhettinger (MO)
- CRC Standard Mathematical Tables
