= Katharina Boll-Dornberger =

Austrian physicist

Katharina Boll-Dornberger (2 November 1909 – 27 July 1981), also known as Käte Dornberger-Schiff, was an Austrian-German physicist and crystallographer. She is known for her work on order-disorder structures.

== Life ==
Katharina Boll-Dornberger was born in Vienna in 1909 as the daughter of the university professor Walter Karl and Alice Friederike (Gertrude) Schiff. She studied physics and mathematics in Vienna and Göttingen. She wrote her dissertation under supervision of V. M. Goldschmidt on the crystal structure of water-free zinc sulfate in Göttingen and handed it in in Vienna in 1934. Afterwards, she conducted research in Philipp Gross's lab in Vienna. In 1937 she emigrated to England. In England, she worked with John D. Bernal, Nevill F. Mott, and Dorothy Hodgkin. She married Paul Dornberger in 1939. Her sons were born in 1943 and 1946. In 1946, she and her family returned to Germany. At first, she worked as a lecturer for physics and mathematics at the Hochschule für Baukunst in Weimar. Then, she moved to East Berlin. Starting in 1948, she was the head of a department at the Institut für Biophysik at the German Academy of Sciences at Berlin. In 1952, she married Ludwig Boll (1911–1984), a German mathematician. (Note: Ludwig Boll (1911-12-10 Gaulsheim, Germany – 1984-12-02), GND 1068090308, German mathematician.) In 1956, she became a professor at the Humboldt University. In 1958, the Institut für Strukturforschung was created and she was head of the institute until 1968. She died in 1981 in Berlin.

== Research ==
Her research focused on the crystallographic investigation of order-disorder structures. She introduced groupoids to crystallography to describe disordered structures. Roughly 2/3 of her 60 publications focused on order-disorder. The other publications dealt with structure determination of organic and inorganic crystals, methods development in single-crystal diffraction, and the development of equipment for this purpose.

== Awards ==
For her work in crystallography, she was awarded two national awards by the German Democratic Republic:

- Patriotic Order of Merit in 1959
- National Prize of the German Democratic Republic in 1960

A street in Berlin is named after her.
