= Luigi Chierchia =

Italian mathematician

Luigi Chierchia (born 1957) is an Italian mathematician, specializing in nonlinear differential equations, mathematical physics, and dynamical systems (celestial mechanics and Hamiltonian systems).

Chierchia studied physics and mathematics at the Sapienza University of Rome with Laurea degree in 1981 with supervisor Giovanni Gallavotti. After a year of military service, Chierchia studied mathematics at the Courant Institute of New York University and received his PhD there in 1985. His doctoral dissertation Quasi-Periodic Schrödinger Operators in One Dimension, Absolutely Continuous Spectra, Bloch Waves and integrable Hamiltonian Systems was supervised by Henry P. McKean. As a postdoc, Chierchia studied at the University of Arizona, ETH Zurich and the École Polytechnique in Paris. Since 2002 he has been Professor of Mathematical Analysis at Roma Tre University.

With Fabio Pusateri and his doctoral student Gabriella Pinzari, he succeeded in extending the KAM theorem for the three-body problem to the n-body problem. In KAM theory, Chierchia addressed invariant tori in phase-space Hamiltonian systems and stability questions. He has also done research on Arnold diffusion, spectral theory of the quasiperiodic one-dimensional Schrödinger equation, and analogs of KAM theory in infinite-dimensional Hamiltonian systems and partial differential equations (almost periodic nonlinear wave equations).

He was an invited speaker (with Gabriella Pinzari) at the International Congress of Mathematicians in Seoul in 2014, and at the conference Dynamics, Equations and Applications in Kraków in 2019.

== Selected publications ==
- Celletti, Alessandra; Chierchia, Luigi (1987). "Rigorous estimates for a computer-assisted KAM theory". Journal of Mathematical Physics. 28 (9): 2078–2086. Bibcode:1987JMP....28.2078C. doi:10.1063/1.527418.
- Celletti, Alessandra; Chierchia, Luigi (1995). "A Constructive Theory of Lagrangian Tori and Computer-assisted Applications". Dynamics Reported. Vol. 4. pp. 60–129. doi:10.1007/978-3-642-61215-2_2. ISBN 978-3-642-64748-2.
- Celletti, Alessandra; Chierchia, Luigi (1997). "On the Stability of Realistic Three-Body Problems". Communications in Mathematical Physics. 186 (2): 413–449. Bibcode:1997CMaPh.186..413C. doi:10.1007/s002200050115. S2CID 122101189.
- Bessi, Ugo; Chierchia, Luigi; Valdinoci, Enrico (2001). "Upper bounds on Arnold diffusion times via Mather theory". Journal de Mathématiques Pures et Appliquées. 80: 105–129. doi:10.1016/S0021-7824(00)01188-0. hdl:2108/16230.
- Chierchia, Luigi (2003). "KAM lectures" (PDF). Dynamical Systems. Part I, Pubbl. Cent. Ric. Mat. Ennio Giorgi. 12: 1–55.
- Celletti, Alessandra; Chierchia, Luigi (2005). "KAM Stability for a three-body problem of the Solar system". Zeitschrift für Angewandte Mathematik und Physik. 57 (1): 33–41. Bibcode:2005ZaMP...57...33C. doi:10.1007/s00033-005-0002-0. S2CID 55337124.
- Biasco, Luca; Chierchia, Luigi; Valdinoci, Enrico (2006). "N-Dimensional Elliptic Invariant Tori for the Planar (N+1)-Body Problem". SIAM Journal on Mathematical Analysis. 37 (5): 1560–1588. doi:10.1137/S0036141004443646. hdl:2434/472851. S2CID 5353717.
- Celletti, Alessandra; Chierchia, Luigi (2009). "Quasi-Periodic Attractors in Celestial Mechanics". Archive for Rational Mechanics and Analysis. 191 (2): 311–345. Bibcode:2009ArRMA.191..311C. doi:10.1007/s00205-008-0141-5. S2CID 55999349.
- Chierchia, Luigi; Pinzari, Gabriella (2011). "The planetary N-body problem: Symplectic foliation, reductions and invariant tori". Inventiones Mathematicae. 186 (1): 1–77. Bibcode:2011InMat.186....1C. doi:10.1007/s00222-011-0313-z. S2CID 55578455.
