= Horst Knörrer =

German mathematician

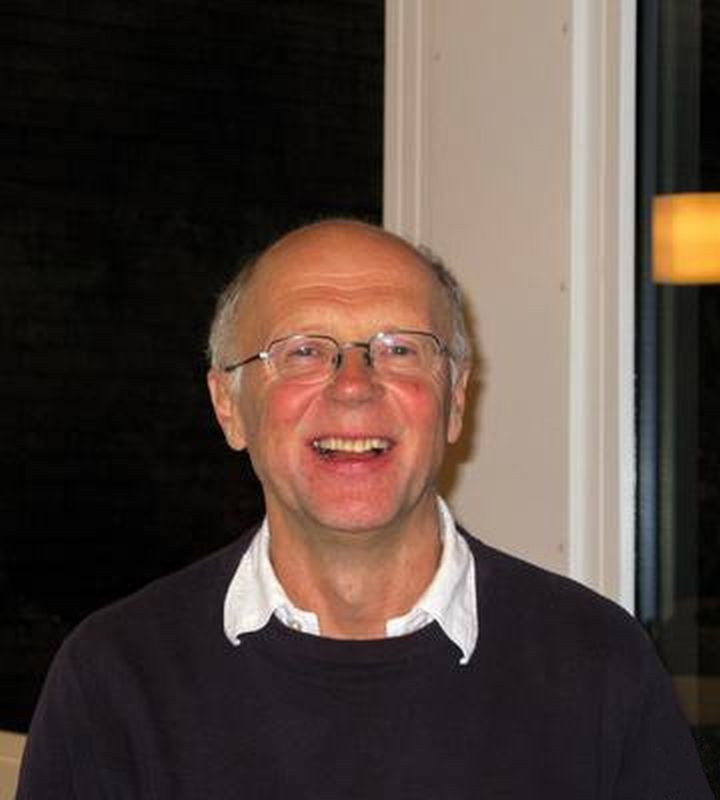
Knörrer at Oberwolfach, 2010

Horst Knörrer (born 31 July 1953, in Bayreuth) is a German mathematician who studies algebraic geometry and mathematical physics.

Knörrer studied from 1971 at University of Regensburg and University of Erlangen-Nuremberg and received a doctorate in 1978 from the University of Bonn under the supervision of Egbert Brieskorn (Isolierte Singularitäten von Durchschnitten zweier Quadriken). After that, he was a research assistant until 1985 in Bonn, interrupted by two years 1980 to 1982 at the Leiden University. In 1985 he completed his habilitation in Bonn and was a Heisenberg fellow the following two years. During 1986/87, he was a department representative at the University of Düsseldorf. Since 1987, he is a full professor of mathematics at the ETH Zurich.

Knörrer studies algebraic geometry and its connection to mathematical physics, for example, for integrable systems, as well as mathematical theory of many-particle systems in statistical mechanics and solid state physics (Fermi liquids). Together with Brieskorn, he wrote an extensive and rich illustrated textbook on algebraic curves, which also was translated into English.

== Writings ==
- Brieskorn, Egbert; Knörrer, Horst (1986). Plane algebraic curves. Basel: Birkhäuser Verlag. ISBN 3-7643-1769-8. OCLC 13859507.
- Knörrer, Horst (2006). Geometrie ein Lehrbuch für Mathematik- und Physikstudierende (in German). Wiesbaden. ISBN 978-3-8348-0210-1. OCLC 255407076.
- Bättig, D.; Knörrer, H. (1991). Singularitäten. Basel. ISBN 978-3-0348-8657-4. OCLC 913664195.
- Feldman, Joel S.; Knörrer, Horst; Trubowitz, Eugene (1996). Riemann surfaces of infinite genus: IV: the Kadomcev Petviashvilli equation (Report). ETH Zurich. doi:10.3929/ETHZ-A-004352755. hdl:20.500.11850/146387.
- Feldman, Joel S.; Knörrer, Horst; Trubowitz, Eugene (2002). Fermionic functional integrals and the renormalization group. Providence, R.I.: American Mathematical Society. ISBN 0-8218-2878-9. OCLC 49493166.
- Gieseker, D.; Knörrer, Horst; Trubowitz, Eugene (1992). The geometry of algebraic Fermi curves. Boston: Academic Press. ISBN 0-12-282620-5. OCLC 26304543.
