= Annenschule =

School in Saint Petersburg, Russia

Coordinates: 59.945°N 30.351°E

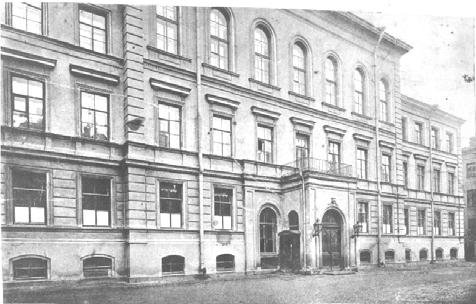
Annenschule gymnasium in 1912

Saint Anna German High School (Russian: Главное немецкое училище Святой Анны), usually known as Annenschule (Russian: Анненшуле), was a school in Saint Petersburg, Russia founded in 1736 for children of the German population of the city. In 1918, Annenschule became Soviet work school №11, and later school №203. Its alumni included ethnologist Nicholai Miklukho-Maklai, jeweler Peter Fabergé, philologist Faddei Zielinski, teacher and physician Peter Lesgaft, poet and Nobel Prize laureate Joseph Brodsky, actress Elena Granovsky, writer Igor Yefimov, and chess world championship pretendent Victor Korchnoi. In 1975 the specialized high school №239 moved into the building.

== History ==
In 1711, a foundry was established on the left bank of Neva River in Saint Petersburg in order to equip the Russian Army for the Great Northern War. Its operation required skilled employees. Therefore, Peter the Great invited foreign professionals from Switzerland, Holland and Germany. Many of them came together with their families, and they settled together by nationality in settlements called sloboda. A German sloboda was located in the area close to today's Liteyny Prospekt, and had a strong Lutheran community. In 1720–1722, a wooden Lutheran church was built on the edge of the sloboda. Its first pastor started to teach German to the children. Soon these classes became popular, and Shatner started a campaign to build a dedicated building for the school. With the help of Jacob Bruce the school was built, and on January 3, 1736, it was formally open. That was the beginning of Annenschule.

In 1734–1740, the new temple was built in place of the old one. 1740 was the year in which Empress Anna Ioanovna died and bequeathed a sum of money for building of the new temple. Therefore, it was decided that the church would have the name of Saint Anna. The school also received the same name. From that time it was called "School of St. Anna", Annenschule in German.

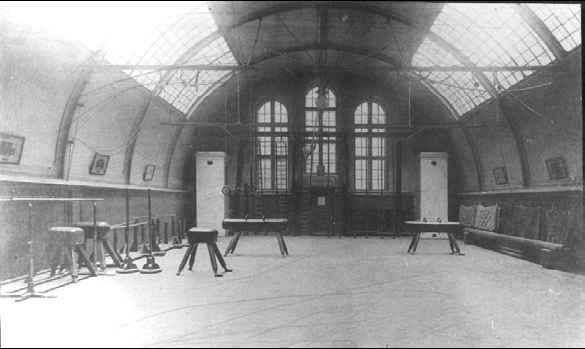
The gym of 1889 (c.1900)

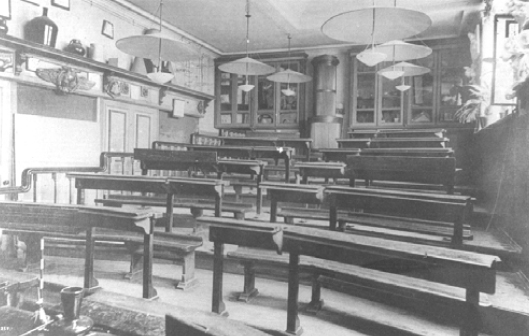
The drawing room of 1896 (1912)

In 1775–1779, architect Yury Felten (best known for his work on the iron-cast grille of the Summer Garden) built the stone Church of Saint Anna, which survived until recently. In 1867, there were 537 boys and 307 girls. There was a lack of classrooms to accommodate such numbers, so in 1868 the new building was built. The school reached its highest point during the period from 1884–1910. During these 26 years the school was expanding: from 1153 students in 1884 to 1733 in 1908.

At the beginning of the 20th century, Annenschule consisted of boys' and girls' gymnasiums, realschule, an elementary school and an orphan house. In 1905-1906 a new building was built on the other side of the Saint Anna Church.

After the October Revolution, on October 18, 1918, Saint Anna School was nationalized, and by decree of Sovnarkom it was included in the government education structure. The Soviet work school was established on the base of the school. Teaching in German was first reduced, and later eliminated. In 1934 the school was split, with school №32 (later №203) occupying the newer building, and school №11 (later school №189) staying in the old building. In 1975 the city's specialized high school №239 with advanced programs in physics and mathematics moved into the old building.

== Famous alumni ==
- Magda Nachman Acharya
- Alexander Beggrov
- Joseph Brodsky
- Nicholai Miklukho-Maklai
- Peter Carl Fabergé
- Vladimir Propp
- Vasily Vasilievich Struve
- Peter Lesgaft
- Sergey Martinson
- Bruno Freindlich
- Elena Granovsky
- Victor Korchnoi
- Evgeny Kliachkin
- August Morawitz
- Igor Yefimov
- Tadeusz Stefan Zieliński
