= Oleg Marichev =

Russian mathematician

Oleg Igorevich Marichev
- Born: 7 September 1945 (age 80); Velikiye Luki, Russian SFSR, USSR
- Education: University of Belarus
- Known for: tables of series and integrals
- Scientific career
- Fields: Mathematics
- Doctoral advisor: Fedor Gakhov

Oleg Igorevich Marichev (Russian: Олег Игоревич Маричев; born 7 September 1945 in Velikiye Luki, Russia) is a Russian mathematician. In 1949 he moved to Minsk with his parents. He graduated from the University of Belarus, where he continued to study for the Ph.D. degree. His scientific supervisor was Fedor Gakhov. He is the co-author of a comprehensive five volume series of Integrals and Series (Gordon and Breach Science Publishers, 1986–1992) together with Yury Brychkov and A. P. Prudnikov. Around 1990 he received the D.Sc. degree (Habilitation) in mathematics from the University of Jena, Germany. In 1992, Marichev started working with Stephen Wolfram on Mathematica. His wife Anna helps him in his job.

== Works ==
- Marichev, Oleg Igorevich (Маричев, Олег Игоревич) (1983). Handbook of integral transforms of higher transcendental functions: theory and algorithmic tables. Ellis Horwood Series in Mathematics and its Applications (in Russian). Translated by Longdon, L. W. Chichester: Ellis Horwood Ltd.
- Brychkov, Yury Aleksandrovich (Брычков, Юрий Александрович); Marichev, Oleg Igorevich (Маричев, Олег Игоревич); Prudnikov, Anatolii Platonovich (Прудников, Анатолий Платонович) (1986). Tables of indefinite integrals (in Russian). Translated by Gould, G. G. Moscow: Nauka (Наука).
- Prudnikov, Anatolii Platonovich (Прудников, Анатолий Платонович); Brychkov, Yury Aleksandrovich (Брычков, Юрий Александрович); Marichev, Oleg Igorevich (Маричев, Олег Игоревич). Integraly i ryady Интегралы и ряды [Integrals and series] (in Russian). Vol. 1–5 (1 ed.). Nauka (Наука). 1981−1986.

- Prudnikov, Anatolii Platonovich (Прудников, Анатолий Платонович); Brychkov, Yury Aleksandrovich (Брычков, Юрий Александрович); Marichev, Oleg Igorevich (Маричев, Олег Игоревич) (2002) [1986]. Integrals and Series. Vol. 1: Elementary Functions. Translated by Queen, N. M. (1 ed.). Gordon & Breach Science Publishers / CRC Press. ISBN 2-88124-089-5. OCLC 916363878. (First published 1986?; fourth printing: 1998; ? printing: 2002.) (798 pages)
- Prudnikov, Anatolii Platonovich (Прудников, Анатолий Платонович); Brychkov, Yury Aleksandrovich (Брычков, Юрий Александрович); Marichev, Oleg Igorevich (Маричев, Олег Игоревич) (2002) [1986]. Integrals and Series. Vol. 2: Special functions. Translated by Queen, N. M. (1 ed.). OPA (Overseas Publishers Association) Amsterdam B.V. / Gordon & Breach Science Publishers / CRC Press. ISBN 2-88124-090-9. OCLC 50653126. (First published 1986; second printing with corrections: 1988; third printing with corrections: 1992; fourth printing: 1998; ? printing: 2002.) (750 pages.)
- Prudnikov, Anatolii Platonovich (Прудников, Анатолий Платонович); Brychkov, Yury Aleksandrovich (Брычков, Юрий Александрович); Marichev, Oleg Igorevich (Маричев, Олег Игоревич) (2002) [1990]. Integrals and Series. Vol. 3: More special functions. Translated by Gould, G. G. (1 ed.). OPA (Overseas Publishers Association) Amsterdam B.V. / Gordon & Breach Science Publishers / CRC Press. ISBN 2-88124-682-6. OCLC 916363880. (Second printing: 1998; third corrected printing: 1998; ? printing: 2002.) (800 pages.)
- Prudnikov, Anatolii Platonovich (Прудников, Анатолий Платонович); Brychkov, Yury Aleksandrovich (Брычков, Юрий Александрович); Marichev, Oleg Igorevich (Маричев, Олег Игоревич). Integrals and Series. Vol. 4: Direct Laplace Transforms (1 ed.). OPA (Overseas Publishers Association) Amsterdam B.V. / Gordon & Breach Science Publishers / CRC Press. OCLC 63722509. (Second printing: 1998.) (xviii+618 pages.)
- Prudnikov, Anatolii Platonovich (Прудников, Анатолий Платонович); Brychkov, Yury Aleksandrovich (Брычков, Юрий Александрович); Marichev, Oleg Igorevich (Маричев, Олег Игоревич). Integrals and Series. Vol. 5: Inverse Laplace Transforms (1 ed.). OPA (Overseas Publishers Association) Amsterdam B.V. / Gordon & Breach Science Publishers / CRC Press. ISBN 2-88124838-1. OCLC 489706146. (xx+595 pages.)

- Prudnikov, Anatolii Platonovich (Прудников, Анатолий Платонович); Brychkov, Yury Aleksandrovich (Брычков, Юрий Александрович); Marichev, Oleg Igorevich (Маричев, Олег Игоревич) (2003). Integraly i ryady Интегралы и ряды [Integrals and series] (in Russian). Vol. Set 1-3 (2nd revised ed.). Fiziko-Matematicheskaya Literatura, Fizmatlit (Физматлит). ISBN 978-5-9221-0322-0. (reprint 2013 by Let Me Print)

- Prudnikov, Anatolii Platonovich (Прудников, Анатолий Платонович); Brychkov, Yury Aleksandrovich (Брычков, Юрий Александрович); Marichev, Oleg Igorevich (Маричев, Олег Игоревич) (2003). Integraly i ryady Интегралы и ряды [Integrals and series: Elementary functions] (in Russian). Vol. 1: Elementarnye funktsii (Элементарные функции) (2nd revised ed.). Fiziko-Matematicheskaya Literatura, Fizmatlit (Физматлит). ISBN 978-5-9221-0323-7. OCLC 937142305. (630 pages) (reprint 2013 by Let Me Print)
- Prudnikov, Anatolii Platonovich (Прудников, Анатолий Платонович); Brychkov, Yury Aleksandrovich (Брычков, Юрий Александрович); Marichev, Oleg Igorevich (Маричев, Олег Игоревич) (2003). Integraly i ryady Интегралы и ряды [Integrals and series: Special functions] (in Russian). Vol. 2: Spetsialnye funktsii (Специальные функции) (2nd revised ed.). Fiziko-Matematicheskaya Literatura, Fizmatlit (Физматлит). ISBN 978-5-9221-0324-4. (663 pages) (reprint 2013 by Let Me Print)
- Prudnikov, Anatolii Platonovich (Прудников, Анатолий Платонович); Brychkov, Yury Aleksandrovich (Брычков, Юрий Александрович); Marichev, Oleg Igorevich (Маричев, Олег Игоревич) (2003). Integraly i ryady Интегралы и ряды [Integrals and series: Special functions. Further chapters.] (in Russian). Vol. 3: Spetsialnye funktsii. Dopolnitelnye glavy (2nd revised ed.). Fiziko-Matematicheskaya Literatura, Fizmatlit (Физматлит). ISBN 978-5-9221-0325-1. (710 pages) (reprint 2013 by Let Me Print)

- Samko, Stefan Grigor'evich Samko (Самко, Стефан Григорьевич); Kilbas, Kilbas, Anatoly Alexandrovich (Килбас, Анатолий Александрович); Marichev, Oleg Igorevich (Маричев, Олег Игоревич) (1993-10-15). Fractional Integrals and Derivatives: Theory and Applications. Vol. I (1 ed.). Gordon and Breach. ISBN 978-2-8812-4864-1. (976 pages)
- Brychkov, Yury Aleksandrovich (Брычков, Юрий Александрович); Marichev, Oleg Igorevich (Маричев, Олег Игоревич) (2017-10-15). Handbook of Integrals and Series Set. Vol. I–II (1 ed.). CRC Press, Inc. ISBN 978-1-4398-2900-4. (2688 pages)

- Brychkov, Yury Aleksandrovich (Брычков, Юрий Александрович); Marichev, Oleg Igorevich (Маричев, Олег Игоревич) (2015-04-30). Handbook of Integrals and Series. Vol. I: Elementary functions (1 ed.). CRC Press, Inc. ISBN 978-1-4398-2896-0. (1344 pages)
- Brychkov, Yury Aleksandrovich (Брычков, Юрий Александрович); Marichev, Oleg Igorevich (Маричев, Олег Игоревич) (2017-10-15). Handbook of Integrals and Series. Vol. II: Special functions (1 ed.). CRC Press, Inc. ISBN 978-1-4398-2898-4. (1344 pages)
