= Reading Research Quarterly =

- Discipline: Education
- Language: English
- Edited by: Chase Young, Juan Araujo, Michelle Bedeker, Janet Gaffney, Bethanie Pletcher

Publication details
- History: 1966-present
- Publisher: Wiley-Blackwell on behalf of the International Literacy Association
- Frequency: Quarterly
- Impact factor: 3.8 (2025)

Standard abbreviations
- ISO 4: Read. Res. Q.

Indexing
- CODEN: RRQUA6
- ISSN: 0034-0553 (print); 1936-2722 (web)
- LCCN: 66009907
- OCLC no.: 01763481

Links
- Journal homepage; Online access; Online archive

Reading Research Quarterly is a quarterly peer-reviewed academic journal published by Wiley-Blackwell. The current editors are Chase Young (Sam Houston State University), Juan Araujo (Texas Woman's University), Michelle Bedeker (New Uzbekistan University), Janet Gaffney (University of Auckland) and Bethanie Pletcher (Texas A&M University-Corpus Christi). The journal is one of three journals published on behalf of the International Literacy Association.

According to the Journal Citation Reports, the journal has a 2025 impact factor of 3.8.
