= Alexander Banaishchik =

Russian screenwriter

- Александр Михайлович Банайщик
- Born: Alexander Mikhailovich Banaishchik; March 16, 1996 (age 29); Velikiye Luki, Pskov Oblast, Russia
- Citizenship: Russia
- Occupations: screenwriter, videoblogger

Alexander Banaishchik (Russian: Александр Михайлович Банайщик; 16 March 1996, Velikiye Luki, Russia) is a Russian screenwriter and videoblogger.

== Biography ==
Alexander Banaishchik gained popularity as a videoblogger, screenwriter and prankster. In 2018, he moved to Moscow, where Alexander began actively working on his Instagram, he began shooting videos and writing scripts.
