= Anatoli Prudnikov =

Russian mathematician (1927–1999)

Anatolii Platonovich Prudnikov
- Born: 14 January 1927
- Died: 10 January 1999 (aged 71)
- Occupation: Mathematician

Anatolii Platonovich Prudnikov (Анатолий Платонович Прудников; 14 January 1927 in Ulyanovsk, Russia – 10 January 1999) was a Russian mathematician.

In 1930 the Prudnikov family moved to Samara, where Anatolii passed his Abitur in 1944. He then studied at the Kuibyshev Aviation Institute for three years and at the Kuibyshev Pedagogical Institute for one year before completing his degree qualifying him as a teacher. In 1968 he received his doctorate under the direction of Vitalii Arsenievich Ditkin with the thesis On a class of integral transforms of Volterra type and some generalizations of operational calculus. With Ditkin, he published several handbooks on integral transforms and operational calculus. Prudnikov's fame derives mainly from the five-volume work "Integrals and Series" (1981–1992), written with Yuri Aleksandrovich Brychkov and Oleg Igorevich Marichev.

== Works ==
- Prudnikov, Anatolii Platonovich (Прудников, Анатолий Платонович); Brychkov, Yury Aleksandrovich (Брычков, Юрий Александрович); Marichev, Oleg Igorevich (Маричев, Олег Игоревич) (1986). Tables of Indefinite Integrals (in Russian). Moscow: Nauka.
- Prudnikov, Anatolii Platonovich (Прудников, Анатолий Платонович); Brychkov, Yury Aleksandrovich (Брычков, Юрий Александрович); Marichev, Oleg Igorevich (Маричев, Олег Игоревич). Integrals and Series (in Russian). Vol. 1–5 (1 ed.). Nauka. 1981−1986. (English, translated from the Russian by N. M. Queen), volumes 1–5, Gordon & Breach Science Publishers / CRC Press, 1988–1992, ISBN 2-88124-097-6. Second revised edition (Russian), volumes 1–3, Fiziko-Matematicheskaya Literatura, 2003.
