= Specialized schools in the Soviet Union =

Secondary schools in Russia

Specialized schools are secondary schools with enhanced coverage of certain subjects that constitute the specialization of the school. They should not be identified with vocational schools, whose goal is to deliver skills for a particular type of job.

== Soviet Union and post-Soviet states ==
Of the specialized school in the Soviet Union (Russian: Школа с уклоном, Shkola s uklonom) there were three typical types: physmath or physical/mathematical schools, with enhanced education in physics and mathematics, sports school, and schools with advanced study of a foreign language of choice. This tradition continued in a number of post-Soviet states, notably Russia, Kyrgyzstan, Belarus and Ukraine, with many schools renamed into lyceums.

There also were schools with musical education, but they were in their own category and called "secondary musical school". In secondary musical schools, the primary goal was musical education from the 1st grade (i.e., they may be classified as vocational schools), with obligatory general secondary education provided in a somewhat truncated form. (Note: In the terminology of the Soviet Union, the "secondary school" included primary education as well, i.e., it encompassed grades 1–10.)

Foreign language schools started study of a particular foreign language from the 1st grade (in regular Soviet schools foreign language was introduced in the 5th grade) and, from some grade (commonly the 5th) some subjects were delivered in this language. Language schools specialized in English, German, French, and Spanish languages, with English schools being most common in late Soviet Union and Spanish least common.

Physmath schools delivered enhanced education in physics and mathematics. Most commonly, this enhancement started at higher grades, typically starting in the 8th or 9th grades.

A fact of note was a very high percentage of Jewish students in physmath schools. There was no informal quota for Jews in specialized schools, unlike some prestigious universities and research institutions.

There are three categories of sports schools:

- Children and Youth Sports School (USSR, Детско-юношеские спортивные школы, ДЮСШ). Some of them were after-school sports schools, others were specialized sports schools.
- Olympic Reserve School (школа олимпийского резерва, специализированная детско-юношеская спортивная школа олимпийского резерва, СДЮСШОР)
- School of High Sports Mastery (школа высшего спортивного мастерства, ШВСМ)

In modern Russia, the sports schools are officially named as 'учреждение дополнительного образования' (supplementary education institution), e.g., 'supplementary education institution "School of High Sports Mastery"'.

These schools were specialized in particular in sports: soccer, diving, gymnastics, etc. The first children's sports school was created in 1934. In 1987 there were about 7,500 CYSSs, 1,400 ORSs and about 200 SHSMs, with about 5,000,000 students.

=== Schools and notable alumni ===
- Moscow
  - Moscow Secondary School 15, physics and mathematics
- Leningrad/ St. Petersburg
  - Leningrad Secondary School # 239 / Saint Petersburg Lyceum 239 (ФМЛ 239), physics and mathematics
    - Grigori Perelman
  - Leningrad Secondary School # 30 / Saint Petersburg Lyceum 30 (ФМЛ 30), physics and mathematics
- Novosibirsk
  - Physical Mathematical School at Novosibirsk State University (ФМШ), physics and mathematics
- Kharkiv
  - Physical Mathematical Secondary School 27 (ФМШ-27), physics and mathematics
    - Vladimir Drinfeld
- Lviv
  - Lviv Physics and Mathematics Lyceum (LPML), physics and mathematics as well as chemistry and biology
- Minsk
  - Minsk Secondary School 50, physics and mathematics
  - Minsk Secondary School 51, mathematics
  - Minsk Secondary School 87, English language
- Perm
  - Secondary School 146, physics, mathematics and informatics
- Ekaterinburg
  - Secondary School 144, English
- Vologda
  - Vologda Multidisciplinary Magnet School
