= Velikiye Luki State Academy of Physical Education and Sports =

Public teachers college in Russia

- Великолукская государственная академия физической культуры
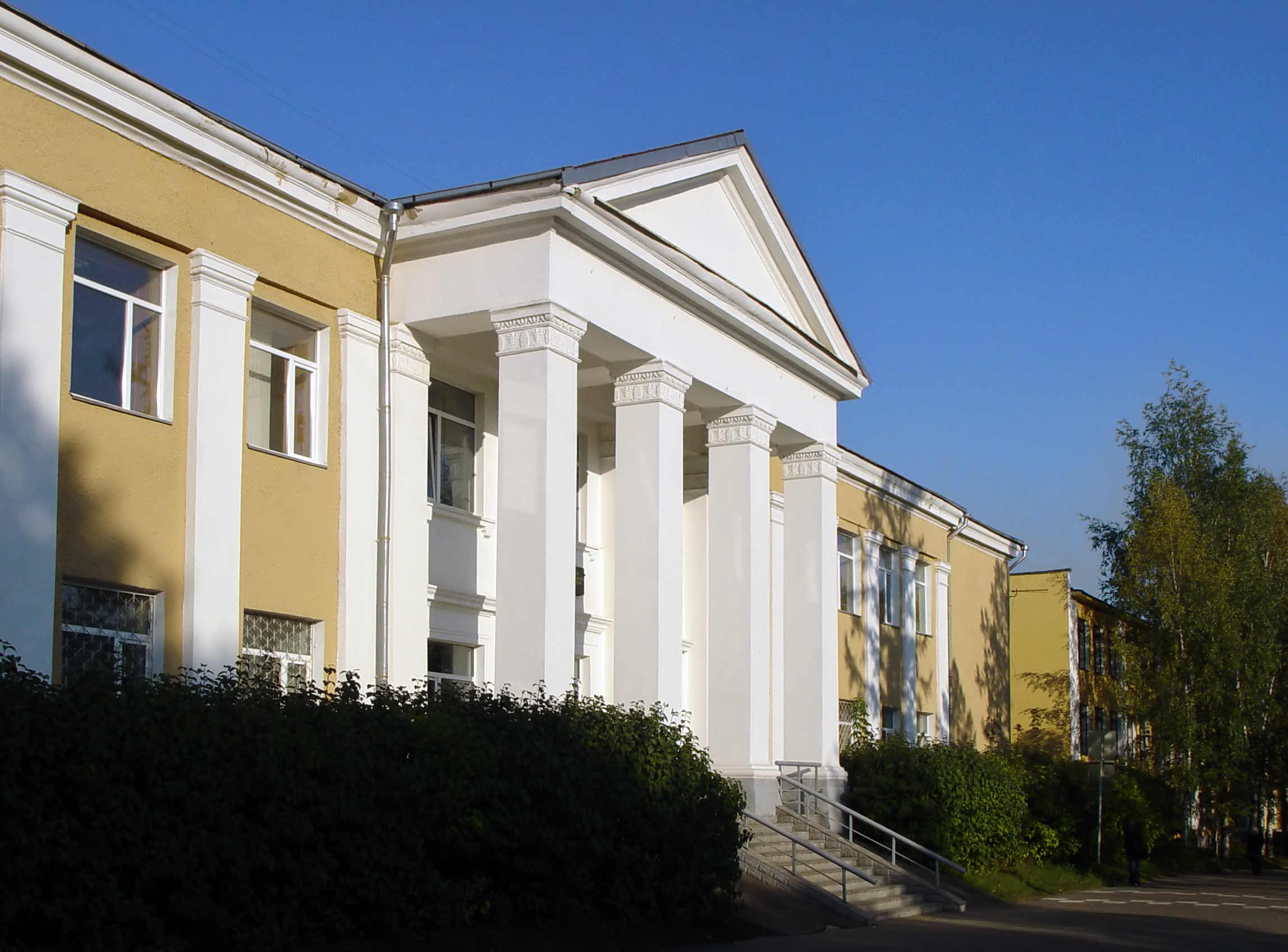
- Former names: Velikiye Luki branch of the Lesgaft National State University of Physical Education, Sport and Health
- Type: public
- Established: 1970
- Rector: Vyacheslav Shlyakhtov
- Students: 2800
- Location: 4 Yubileynaya Square, Velikie Luki, Pskov Oblast, Russia; 56°21′00″N 30°30′47″E
- Campus: urban
- Website: www.vgsa.ru

The Velikiye Luki State Academy of Physical Education and Sports (Velikie Luki SAA; Russian: Великолукская государственная академия физической культуры, ВЛГАФК) is an institute of higher education in Velikie Luki, Pskov Oblast, Russia. It trains physical education teachers, coaches of sports schools, fitness trainers, physical therapy instructors and employees of physical education and rehabilitation centers, sports managers and managers, organizers of mass physical culture and sports events.

== History ==
The need to create an institute of physical culture in the Russian North-West was dictated by insufficient number of physical culture teachers for primary, secondary and higher educational institutions, as well as a lack of sports coaches in the North-Western region.

On June 19, 1970, in the city of Velikiye Luki in Pskov Oblast the Velikiye Luki branch of the Lesgaft National State University of Physical Education, Sport and Health was established on the basis of the abolished Velikiye Luki Pedagogical Institute.

In 2002, it received the status of the State Academy of Physical Culture and Sports. And now the Velikie Luki SAA has a license for the right to conduct educational activities.

== Structure ==
In the academy there are three Faculties:

- Faculty of Physical Education and Sports,
- Faculty of Social Sciences and Humanities,
- Faculty of Distance Learning.
