= Heino Falcke =

German professor of radio astronomy and astroparticle physics

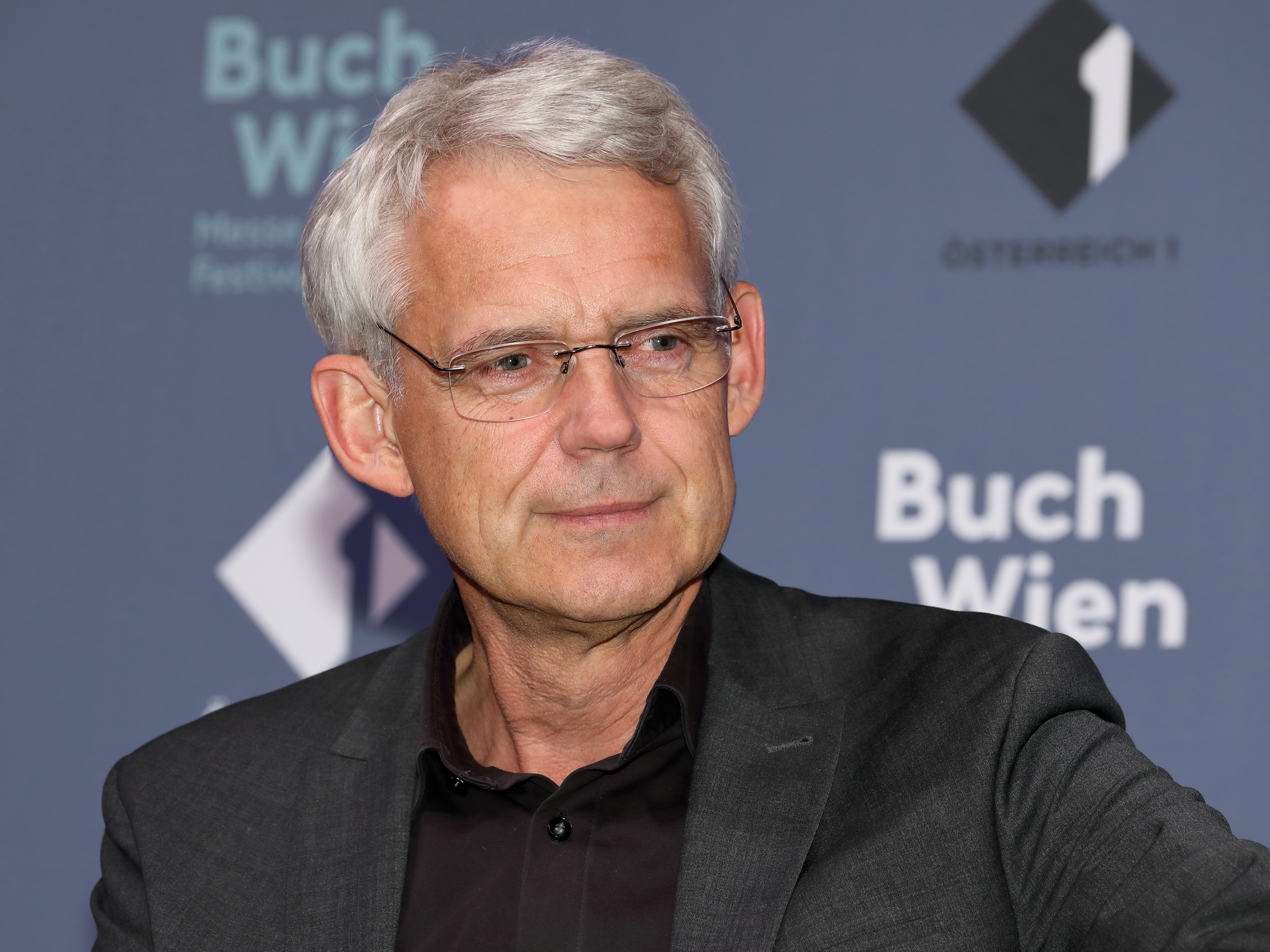
- Falcke in 2025
- Born: 26 September 1966 (age 60); Cologne, West Germany
- Occupations: professor of radio astronomy and astroparticle physics
- Awards: Spinoza Prize (2011); Henry Draper Medal (2021)

Academic background
- Education: University of Cologne, University of Bonn (MSc, PhD, Dr. habil.)
- Website: www.heinofalcke.org

Heino Falcke (born 26 September 1966 in Cologne) is a German professor of radio astronomy and astroparticle physics at the Radboud University Nijmegen (Netherlands). His main field of study is black holes, and he is the originator of the concept of the 'black hole shadow'. In 2019, Falcke announced the first Event Horizon Telescope results at the EHT Press Conference in Brussels.

== Career ==
Falcke studied physics at the University of Cologne from 1986 to 1987, and then at the University of Bonn from 1987 where he graduated with a Diploma (equivalent to a master's degree) in Physics in 1992. He subsequently obtained a PhD degree in Astronomy summa cum laude in 1994 from the University of Bonn.

Falcke subsequently worked as a scientist for the Max Planck Institute for Radio Astronomy in Bonn (1995–1995), the University of Maryland (1995–1997), and the University of Arizona (1999). He was conferred a Habilitation by the University of Bonn in 2000. From 2000 to 2003, he was a staff scientist at the Max Planck Institute for Radio Astronomy in Bonn.

In 2003, Falcke became adjunct professor of Radio Astronomy and Astroparticle physics at Radboud University Nijmegen. He also started working for ASTRON, the radio astronomy institute of the Netherlands. In 2007, he became a full professor at Nijmegen.

== Research ==
Falcke is involved in theoretical astronomy as well as observational and experimental studies. Falcke was one of the leading forces behind the radio telescope LOFAR. Apart from his work with LOFAR, he was also involved in the development of the Square Kilometre Array.

In 2000 he predicted it would be possible to make measurements near the edge of a black hole. Four years later, his team managed to do that.

In 2013, Falcke, together with Luciano Rezzolla of the Max Planck Institute for Gravitational Physics proposed that blitzars could be an explanation for fast radio bursts. Blitzars would occur when a supramassive rotating neutron star slows down enough, loses its magnetic field, and then turns into a black hole.

Falcke predicted that near the edges of a black hole, there would be a 'black hole shadow' that could be detected by a radio telescope. This shadow was eventually observed with the Event Horizon Telescope. On 10 April 2019, the project announced that they created an image of the black hole at the centre of M87 (M87*). On 12 May 2022 followed the image of the central black hole in the Milky Way (Sagittarius A*).

Falcke wishes to place a radio telescope on the Moon and has worked with NASA and European Space Agency researchers to devise a plan to make this happen.

== Awards ==
- 2000 Ludwig Biermann Award for young astronomers of the German Astronomische Gesellschaft
- 2006 Akademiepreis by the Berlin-Brandenburg Academy of Sciences and Humanities
- 2008 ERC Advanced Grant
- 2011 Spinoza prize
- 2013 ERC Synergy Grant
- 2013 Member of the Academia Europaea
- 2014 Member of the Royal Netherlands Academy of Arts and Sciences
- 2016 Knight in the Order of the Netherlands Lion
- 2018 Asteroid 12654 Heinofalcke
- 2021 Henry Draper Medal
- 2021 Amaldi Medal
- 2022 ERC Synergy Grant
- 2023 Herschel Medal
- 2023 Balzan Prize

== Book ==
In 2020, Falcke co-published together with Jörg Römer the popular science book Licht im Dunkeln: Schwarze Löcher, das Universum und wir. In English, it has been translated as Light in the Darkness – Black Holes, the Universe and Us. The book also has translations in German, Dutch, Spanish, Italian and Finnish.

== Personal life ==
Falcke is a devout Christian and serves as lay pastor in the Protestant Church in Germany. He views his faith as a way of achieving internal rest, as well as a motivation to conduct science.
