= Luciano Rezzolla =

Italian professor of relativistic astrophysics and numerical relativity

Luciano Rezzolla Professor of Theoretical Astrophysics
- Born: 25 September 1967 (age 59); Milan, Italy
- Education: SISSA; University of Bari; University of Trieste.
- Known for: Numerical relativity, Relativistic astrophysics, blitzar
- Awards: Karl Schwarzschild Preis 2017; Frankfurt Physics Science Prize (2019) the Bruno Rossi Prize of the American Astronomical Society (2020); Albert Einstein Medal (2020); Fellow of the International Society on General Relativity and Gravitation
- Scientific career
- Fields: Theoretical astrophysics
- Workplaces: Trinity College Dublin; Goethe University Frankfurt; New Uzbekistan University; Louisiana State University; Max Planck Institute for Gravitational Physics

Luciano Rezzolla (born 1967) is an Italian professor of relativistic astrophysics and numerical relativity at the Goethe University Frankfurt. His main field of study is the physics and astrophysics of compact objects such as black holes and neutron stars. It was announced in 2019 that he had been appointed honorary Andrews Professor of Astronomy at Trinity College Dublin (TCD). In 2021, he became Carl W. Fueck Laureatus Chair of Relativistic Astrophysics at Goethe University Frankfurt. He was additionally appointed Honorary Professor at New Uzbekistan University in 2024.

== Education ==
Born in Milan, Italy, in 1967, Rezzolla completed his undergraduate degree in physics at the University of Bari and University of Trieste. After a year in the Italian Navy as submarine officer, he studied at SISSA and received his PhD in 1997 under the supervision of John C. Miller.

== Academic career ==
Following the completion of his doctorate at the International School for Advanced Studies (SISSA) in 1997, Rezzolla joined the University of Illinois Urbana-Champaign as a postdoctoral research fellow, where he conducted research in relativistic astrophysics and numerical relativity. During this period, he expanded his work on compact objects, relativistic hydrodynamics, and Einstein's theory of general relativity, establishing himself as an emerging researcher in computational astrophysics.

In 2000, Rezzolla returned to International School for Advanced Studies (SISSA) in Trieste as a Senior Research Fellow before being appointed Assistant Professor in 2001. He was promoted to Associate Professor in 2004 while simultaneously serving as Director of the institute's Computing Centre between 2004 and 2006. At SISSA, he developed advanced numerical methods for solving Einstein's field equations and established an internationally recognized research programme in relativistic astrophysics.

Alongside his appointment at SISSA, Rezzolla served as Adjunct Professor at Louisiana State University from 2004 to 2013, strengthening collaborations in numerical relativity and gravitational-wave astrophysics with researchers in the United States.

In 2006, Rezzolla joined the Max Planck Institute for Gravitational Physics (Albert Einstein Institute, Potsdam) as Head of the Numerical Relativity Group, a position he held until 2014. Under his leadership, the group became one of Europe's principal centres for computational studies of black holes, neutron stars, and relativistic astrophysical phenomena.

In 2013, Rezzolla was appointed Chair of Theoretical Astrophysics at the Institute for Theoretical Physics of Goethe University Frankfurt. At Frankfurt, he established one of Europe's leading research groups in relativistic astrophysics, combining expertise in numerical relativity, computational physics, nuclear astrophysics, and gravitational-wave science. His research group has investigated black-hole physics, neutron-star mergers, relativistic jets, multi-messenger astronomy, and the physics of dense matter, while developing advanced computational techniques for solving nonlinear problems in general relativity. He has supervised more than twenty-five doctoral students and numerous postdoctoral researchers, many of whom have subsequently obtained faculty positions at universities and research institutes worldwide.

Since 2015, Rezzolla has also served as Senior Fellow at the Frankfurt Institute for Advanced Studies (FIAS), strengthening interdisciplinary collaborations across astrophysics, computational science, and fundamental physics. In 2019, he was appointed The Andrews Professor of Astronomy at Trinity College Dublin, one of the institution's oldest and most distinguished academic appointments.

Beyond his university appointments, Rezzolla has played a leading role in the international astrophysics community. He has served on the Executive Board of the Event Horizon Telescope Collaboration since 2017 and contributed to the theoretical interpretation of the collaboration's first images of the supermassive black hole in M87. He has chaired the European COST Action NewCompStar, co-chaired the ESF-funded CompStar research network, served on the Executive Board of the Virgo-EGO Scientific Forum, and held numerous editorial positions, including membership on the editorial boards of Nature Physics, Classical and Quantum Gravity, Living Reviews in Computational Astrophysics, and Papers in Physics. Since 2024, he has served as Chair of the Gravity and General Relativity Division of the German Physical Society (DPG), reflecting his sustained leadership in gravitational physics and relativistic astrophysics.

== Research ==
Rezzolla's research lies at the intersection of relativistic astrophysics, gravitational physics, and computational science, with a particular focus on black holes, neutron stars, gravitational waves, relativistic hydrodynamics, and high-energy astrophysical phenomena. His work combines analytical theory with large-scale numerical simulations to investigate the behavior of matter and spacetime under extreme gravitational conditions predicted by General relativity. Through the development of advanced computational methods, he has contributed to understanding compact objects and their role as laboratories for fundamental physics.

A central theme of Rezzolla's research has been the physics of neutron stars and binary neutron star mergers. He has developed numerical models describing the inspiral, merger, and post-merger evolution of neutron star binaries, investigating the generation of gravitational waves, electromagnetic counterparts, and the properties of the merger remnants. His studies demonstrated that mergers of magnetized neutron stars can naturally produce relativistic jet-like structures capable of powering short gamma-ray bursts, helping establish the theoretical connection between compact binary mergers and these high-energy astrophysical events. His subsequent work identified quasi-universal relations linking post-merger gravitational-wave signals to the internal structure of neutron stars, providing new methods for constraining the nuclear equation of state from gravitational-wave observations.

Another major area of his scholarship concerns the equation of state of dense nuclear matter. Rezzolla has developed theoretical and statistical approaches for determining the composition and internal properties of neutron stars using gravitational-wave observations, X-ray measurements, and numerical modelling. His research has placed constraints on neutron-star radii, tidal deformabilities, and the maximum mass of non-rotating neutron stars, while exploring the possibility of phase transitions from hadronic to quark matter within stellar cores. His work on post-merger gravitational-wave spectra, including the identification of the long-ringdown signal, has introduced new observational diagnostics for probing matter at supranuclear densities.

Rezzolla has also made substantial contributions to the study of black holes and relativistic gravity. His research encompasses black-hole dynamics, relativistic magnetohydrodynamics, accretion processes, and the numerical solution of Einstein's field equations. He has investigated the interaction of matter and magnetic fields in strong gravitational fields and has developed computational techniques that are widely used in simulations of compact-object mergers and relativistic astrophysical flows. His work has advanced theoretical understanding of black-hole formation, relativistic jets, and the emission of gravitational waves in strong-field gravity.

More recently, Rezzolla's research has expanded to include multi-messenger astrophysics, integrating gravitational waves, neutrinos, electromagnetic observations, and nuclear physics to study compact-object mergers. His investigations of neutrino transport, heavy-element nucleosynthesis, and relativistic radiation transport have improved understanding of the origin of heavy elements produced through the rapid neutron-capture (r-process). He has also explored how observations from next-generation gravitational-wave detectors can be combined with theoretical models to investigate dense matter, fundamental interactions, and the evolution of compact stellar remnants.

Beyond his scientific discoveries, Rezzolla has influenced the field through the development of computational methods and scholarly synthesis. His textbook Relativistic Hydrodynamics (2013) is widely regarded as a standard reference in the field, while his edited volume The Physics and Astrophysics of Neutron Stars (2019) provides a comprehensive overview of modern neutron-star research. Through these works, together with the supervision of numerous doctoral students and postdoctoral researchers, he has contributed to the development of numerical relativity and relativistic astrophysics as major areas of contemporary theoretical physics.

== Awards ==
Rezzolla has received numerous international awards recognizing his contributions to relativistic astrophysics, numerical relativity, gravitational-wave astronomy, and black-hole physics. Among his most notable distinctions are the Karl Schwarzschild Prize (2017), awarded for outstanding achievements in astronomical research; the Frankfurt Physics Science Prize (2019); the Breakthrough Prize in Fundamental Physics (2020), awarded as part of the Event Horizon Telescope Collaboration for producing the first image of a black hole; the Bruno Rossi Prize of the American Astronomical Society (2020); and the Albert Einstein Medal (2020), also shared with the Event Horizon Telescope Collaboration. In 2022, he received the Falling Walls Breakthrough Prize in Physics and was elected a Fellow of the International Society on General Relativity and Gravitation, recognizing his sustained contributions to gravitational physics.

His subsequent honors include appointment as Claus Wilhelm Fueck Professor (2022–2027), delivery of the prestigious Synge Lecture at Trinity College Dublin (2023), invitation to present the keynote address at the Science Summit of the 78th United Nations General Assembly in New York (2023), appointment as Honorary Professor at New Uzbekistan University (2024), the PRACE HPC Excellence Award (2025), the Frontiers of Science Award of the International Congress for Basic Science (shared with the Event Horizon Telescope Collaboration, 2025), and investiture as a Knight of the Order of the Star of Italy by the President of the Italian Republic in 2025. He has also been awarded prestigious European Research Council funding, including an ERC Synergy Grant (2014–2020) and an ERC Advanced Grant (2021–2026), in recognition of the originality and scientific impact of his research programme.

== Public Outreach ==
Rezzolla has always dedicated his attention to the diffusion of his scientific results, especially through the use of advanced visualisations of his simulations. One simulation on gamma-ray bursts has received more than five hundred thousands views on YouTube, while another simulation on the tidal disruption of neutron stars has also attracted a lot of attention with almost a million views, eventually ending-up on the New York Times.

In 2020 he has published his first public-outreach book "The irresistible attraction of gravity", first appeared in Italian and then in other languages, such as German and English.

== Personal life ==
Rezzolla is an avid bluewater sailor and has made a trans-atlantic crossing in 2017 and sailed across the Mediterranen. He is married to Carolin Schneider and father of Anna, Emilia, and Dominik. He lives with his wife in Frankfurt.

== Bibliography ==
- Rezzolla, Luciano; Giacomazzo, Bruno; Baiotti, Luca; Granot, Jonathan; Kouveliotou, Chryssa; Aloy, Miguel A. (1 May 2011). "The missing link: Merging neutron stars naturally produce jet-like structures and can power short Gamma-Ray Bursts". The Astrophysical Journal. 732 (1): L6. arXiv:1101.4298. Bibcode:2011ApJ...732L...6R. doi:10.1088/2041-8205/732/1/L6. ISSN 2041-8205.
- Takami, Kentaro; Rezzolla, Luciano; Baiotti, Luca (28 August 2014). "Constraining the Equation of State of Neutron Stars from Binary Mergers". Physical Review Letters. 113 (9) 091104. arXiv:1403.5672. Bibcode:2014PhRvL.113i1104T. doi:10.1103/PhysRevLett.113.091104. PMID 25215972.
- Baiotti, Luca; Rezzolla, Luciano (1 September 2017). "Binary neutron-star mergers: a review of Einstein's richest laboratory". Reports on Progress in Physics. 80 (9): 096901. arXiv:1607.03540. Bibcode:2017RPPh...80i6901B. doi:10.1088/1361-6633/aa67bb. ISSN 0034-4885. PMID 28319032.
- Most, Elias R.; Weih, Lukas R.; Rezzolla, Luciano; Schaffner-Bielich, Jürgen (25 June 2018). "New Constraints on Radii and Tidal Deformabilities of Neutron Stars from GW170817". Physical Review Letters. 120 (26) 261103. arXiv:1803.00549. Bibcode:2018PhRvL.120z1103M. doi:10.1103/PhysRevLett.120.261103. PMID 30004744.
- Rezzolla, Luciano; Most, Elias R.; Weih, Lukas R. (10 January 2018). "Using Gravitational-wave Observations and Quasi-universal Relations to Constrain the Maximum Mass of Neutron Stars". The Astrophysical Journal Letters. 852 (2): L25. arXiv:1711.00314. Bibcode:2018ApJ...852L..25R. doi:10.3847/2041-8213/aaa401.
- Rezzolla, Luciano; Zanotti, Olindo (26 September 2013). Relativistic Hydrodynamics. OUP Oxford. ISBN 978-0-19-150991-9.
- Rezzolla, L.; Pizzochero, P.; Jones, D. I.; Rea, N.; Vidana, I., eds. (2018). The physics and astrophysics of neutron stars. Cham: Springer. ISBN 978-3319976167.
- Altiparmak, Sinan; Ecker, Christian; Rezzolla, Luciano (1 November 2022). "On the Sound Speed in Neutron Stars". The Astrophysical Journal Letters. 939 (2): L34. arXiv:2203.14974. Bibcode:2022ApJ...939L..34A. doi:10.3847/2041-8213/ac9b2a. ISSN 2041-8205.
- Ecker, Christian; Gorda, Tyler; Kurkela, Aleksi; Rezzolla, Luciano (3 February 2025). "Constraining the equation of state in neutron-star cores via the long-ringdown signal". Nature Communications. 16 (1): 1320. arXiv:2403.03246. Bibcode:2025NatCo..16.1320E. doi:10.1038/s41467-025-56500-x. ISSN 2041-1723. PMC 11790964. PMID 39900914.
- Ng, Harry Ho-Yin; Musolino, Carlo; Tootle, Samuel D.; Rezzolla, Luciano (27 May 2025). "Accurate Muonic Interactions in Neutron Star Mergers and Impact on Heavy-element Nucleosynthesis". The Astrophysical Journal Letters. 985 (2): L36. arXiv:2411.19178. Bibcode:2025ApJ...985L..36N. doi:10.3847/2041-8213/add324. ISSN 2041-8205.
- Zanotti, O.; Rezzolla, L. (March 2002). "General Relativistic Electromagnetic Fields of a Slowly Rotating Magnetized Neutron Star. II. Solution of the Induction Equations". Monthly Notices of the Royal Astronomical Society. 331 (2): 376–388. arXiv:astro-ph/0112032. Bibcode:2002MNRAS.331..376Z. doi:10.1046/j.1365-8711.2002.05196.x.
