= Pavel Belov (physicist) =

Russian physicist (born 1977)

- Born: Pavel Aleksandrovich Belov; December 18, 1977 (age 48); Ust-Ilimsk, Russian SFSR, USSR
- Citizenship: Russia
- Education: ITMO University; Helsinki University of Technology
- Known for: Metamaterials; Plasmonic metamaterials
- Scientific career
- Fields: Physics
- Workplaces: ITMO University; New Uzbekistan University
- Doctoral advisor: Sergei Tretyakov

Pavel Aleksandrovich Belov (Russian: Па́вел Алекса́ндрович Бело́в; born 18 December 1977 in Ust-Ilimsk) is a Russian physicist who is the Director of the School of Physics and Engineering at ITMO University and dean of the School of Engineering of New Uzbekistan University in Tashkent, Uzbekistan.

== Education ==
After completing his education at Saint Petersburg Lyceum 30, Pavel Belov graduated with honors from ITMO University in 2000. He defended his PhD thesis twice: at ITMO University in Russia in 2003 with the thesis "Analytical modeling of electromagnetic crystals", and in Finland in 2006 at the Helsinki University of Technology with the thesis "Analytical modeling of metamaterials and new principle of sub-wavelength imaging". In November 2010 he received a doctor of science degree for his thesis "Transmission of electromagnetic field distributions with subwavelength resolution by means of extremely anisotropic metamaterials".

== Career ==
Belov's primary achievement is the development of metamaterials which can transfer superresolution images (i.e., much smaller than the wavelength of the radiation used), resulting in higher resolutions than conventional optical systems for image transmission and processing.

In 2010 Pavel Belov invited professor Yuri Kivshar as a leading researcher in terms of government Megagrant program. Together they established the International Research Centre for Nanophotonics and Metamaterials. This laboratory performs broad research in the fields of metamaterials, plasmonics, and non-linear optics.

Dr. Belov has worked in Finland, South Korea, and the United Kingdom with companies including Nokia, Samsung Electronics and Bosch. Throughout his career, he was a member of various societies: Institute of Electrical and Electronics Engineers (IEEE), IEEE Antennas & Propagation Society, IEEE Electron Devices Society, IEEE Microwave Theory and Techniques Society, Laser and Electro-Optics Society, International Union of Radio Science (URSI), and SPIE. Since October 2015, Belov has been on the Board of Scientific Advisors at Metamaterial Technologies Inc., an international optical nano-composites company.

Since April 2021, P. Belov has held the position of Director of the School of Physics and Engineering at ITMO University, which implements four bachelor's and nine master's programs. Since September 2024 he is dean of the School of Engineering at New Uzbekistan University.

== Awards ==
Dr. Pavel Belov was given the Russian Federation President's Prize in Science and Innovation for Young Scientists in 2009 (Presidential Decree No.139 of 4.02.2010). The prize was awarded for his contributions to the physics of metamaterials and the development of devices for transmission and processing of superresolution images. He was the winner of grants for State Support of Young Russian Ph.D. Scientists in 2005 and 2009. His other awards include:

- Fellow of the Electromagnetics Academy (USA, 2025)
- Honorary academic title of Professor of the Russian Academy of Sciences. Elected from the Department of Physical Sciences (Russia, 2022)
- IET Achievement Medal (Institution of Engineering and Technology, UK, 2006)
- International Dennis Gabor Award (NOVOFER Foundation, Hungary, 2003)
- URSI Young Scientist Award (Belgium, 2002)

== Publications ==
Pavel Belov is the author of more than 300 scientific articles in refereed journals, 300 conference proceedings and 18 book chapters.

His h-index is 70 (October, 2026). His work has generated over 19,600 citations.

== See also ==
- Metamaterials
- Photonic crystal
