= Saint Petersburg Lyceum 30 =

Physico-Mathematical Lyceum 30
- Физико-математический лицей №30

Location
- Shevchenko str., 23/2; 7th line, 52; Saint Petersburg; Russia
- Coordinates: 59.943°N 30.278°E

Information
- Type: Lyceum
- Established: October 6, 1897
- Principal: Alexey Andreevich Tretyakov
- Grades: 5–11
- Enrollment: 538
- Website: www.school30.spb.ru pml30.ru

Saint Petersburg Lyceum 30 (Russian: Физико-математический лицей №30), is a public high school in Saint Petersburg, Russia that specializes in mathematics and physics. The school opened in 1897 and became a specialized city school in 1965.

== History ==
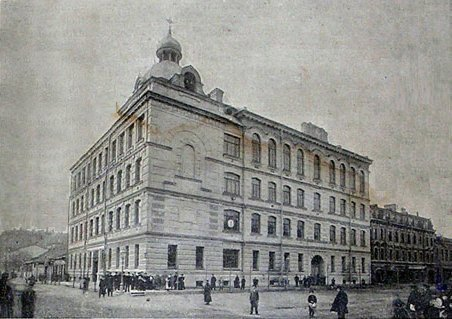
Saint Petersburg Lyceum 30 main building, c. early 20th century

The history of the school began on October 6, 1897, with its establishment on Vasilyevsky Island, becoming the first 12-grade primary school in Saint Petersburg. The namesake of the school is Catherine II (Catherine the Great).

The establishment of the institution was a significant event in the history of St. Petersburg, as the school was a first step by the local government to address and solve a number of problems that existed within the primary education system at the time. The initiative of building the school was led by Mikhail Stasyulevich, a historian, publisher, and chairman of the Commission on Public Education. Stasyulevich sought to create an institution where both young men and women would coexist and learn together. As a result of this, however, Stasyulevich encountered many opponents, and constantly fought against those who sought to defend the old type of primary school. The most serious objection was an indication of the "great danger of schools having several classes as the source of infectious diseases." Despite these setbacks, the project had still gained majority support by City Council, and the school was erected. The Emperor Nikolay II was familiar with the project and approved it himself. The school was then opened on October 6, 1897, and was blessed by the home church 33 days later on November 9, 1897.

In 1965, the school became specialized in mathematics. In 1976, the school was united with School 38 and moved to a building at Shevchenko street, 23/2. Following the merger and move, the school's namesake was changed to Physico-Mathematical School. In 1990, the school was again renamed to Physico-Mathematical Gymnasium, but in 2002 it was finally renamed to Physico-Mathematical Lyceum. In 2005, the school was given back its historical building at the Sredniy prospect, and from that moment on the school has had two buildings: the first at Shevchenko street, where classes 5 to 7 are held, and the second near the Vasileostrovskaya metro station, where 8 - 11 classes are situated.

== Famous alumni ==
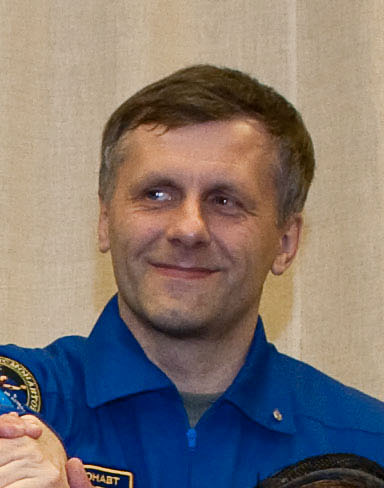
Cosmonaut Andrei Borisenko graduated from Lyceum 30 in 1981.

- Lev Y. Lurie, TV presenter
- Andrei Borisenko, cosmonaut
- Andrey Krasko, actor
- Alexander Lazarev, Soviet theater and film actor
- Vladimir Churov, chairman of the Central Election Commission of Russia
- Maria Chudnovsky, mathematics professor at Princeton
- Marina Neyolova, actress
- Pavel Belov, scientist
- Dmitry Dmitriyenko, Governor of Murmansk

== See also ==
- Saint Petersburg Lyceum 239
