= Blitzar =

Hypothetical type of neutron star

In astronomy, blitzars are a hypothetical type of neutron star, specifically pulsars that can rapidly collapse into black holes if their spinning slows down. Heino Falcke and Luciano Rezzolla proposed these stars in 2013 as an explanation for fast radio bursts.

== Overview ==
These stars, if they exist, are thought to start from a neutron star with a mass that would cause it to collapse into a black hole if it were not rapidly spinning. Instead, the neutron star spins fast enough so that its centrifugal force overcomes gravity. This makes the neutron star a typical but doomed pulsar whose strong magnetic field radiates energy away and slows its spin.

Eventually the weakening centrifugal force is no longer able to halt the pulsar from collapsing into a black hole. At that moment, part of the pulsar's magnetic field outside the black hole is suddenly cut off from its vanished source. This magnetic energy is instantly transformed into a burst of wide spectrum radio energy. (Note: Thornton, D.; Stappers, B.; Bailes, M.; Barsdell, B.; Bates, S.; Bhat, N.D.R.; et al. (5 July 2013). "A population of fast radio bursts at cosmological distances". Science. 341 (6141): 53–56. arXiv:1307.1628. Bibcode:2013Sci...341...53T. doi:10.1126/science.1236789. PMID 23828936. S2CID 206548502. For a popular summary see) As of January 2015, seven radio events detected so far might represent such possible collapses; they are projected to occur every 10 seconds within the observable universe. Because the magnetic field had previously cleared the surrounding space of gas and dust, there is no nearby material that will fall into the new black hole. Thus there is no burst of X-rays or gamma rays that usually happens when other black holes form.

If blitzars exist, they may offer a new way to observe details of black hole formation.

In January 2015, a flash of radio waves was caught in real time, also known as a fast radio burst. Scientific arguments emerged that this may be the first recorded capture of the existence of a blitzar.
