= Sports school =

School specializing in sports and fitness

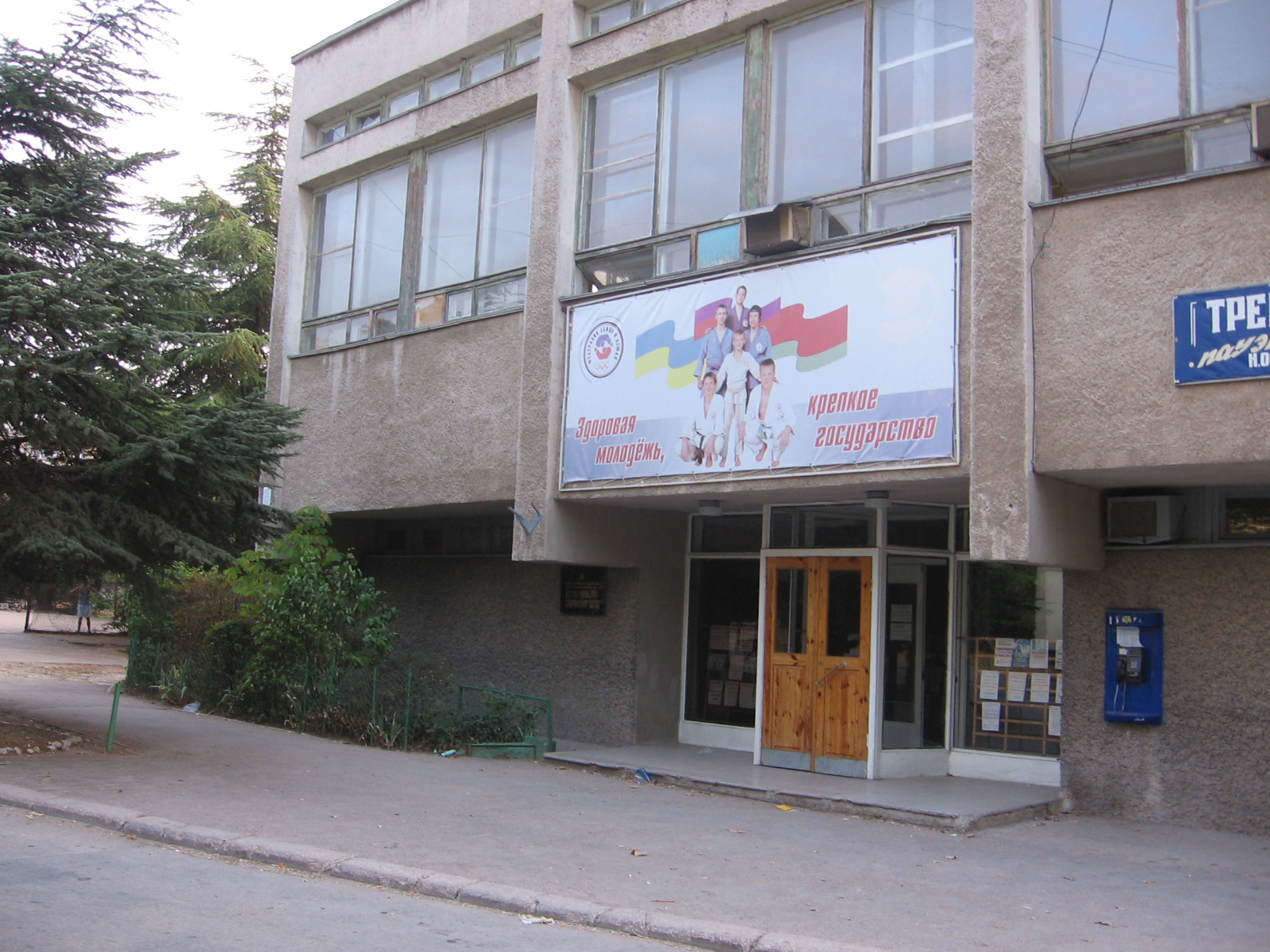
Sports school in Sevastopol

A sports school (Russian: Детско-Юношеская Спортивная Школа, ДЮСШ) is a type of educational institution for children that originated in the Soviet Union. Sports schools were the basis of the powerful system of physical culture (fitness) and sports education in the USSR and the Eastern Bloc, particularly East Germany. The main features of this system remain in the system of sports education in Russia and other post-Soviet states, and also became the basis of similar systems in other countries, one of the most powerful ones at the present time being that of the People's Republic of China. Many legendary athletes, such as Nikolai Andrianov, Nellie Kim, Alexander Popov, Viktor Krovopuskov, Vladislav Tretiak, Valeri Kharlamov, Katarina Witt, Anatoly Alyabyev and Sergey Bubka started their path to Olympic success from Soviet sports schools. They are also found in Asia, in countries such as Singapore, Malaysia and Australia.

== Establishment and early years ==
The system of sports schools was founded in the 1930s. In 1934, Young Pioneers Stadium was built in Moscow, the first specialized sports extracurricular institution in the USSR. In the same year the first children's collective was established by Dynamo sports society; this was a prototype of sports schools by sports societies.

The first sports schools opened in 1934 in Moscow, Tbilisi, Kiev, then they were opened in Leningrad, Rostov-on-Don, Tashkent and other cities of the USSR; they were created and functioned on the basis of regulations, approved by the Central Soviet of Sports Societies and Organizations of the USSR.

In 1940, there were 262 sports schools in the USSR and dozens of these schools functioned in the USSR by Dynamo sports society, Spartak sports society, CDKA, sports societies of Trade Unions, OSOAVIAKHIM and in the system of education.

In April 1941, a decision was made to increase the number of physical education lessons in all schools in the USSR and to create sports schools in all major cities of the USSR in 1942. This decision was not carried out because on June 22, 1941, when the Axis forces launched a military invasion of the USSR. During the military operations of the Great Patriotic War, the occupation of the western regions of the USSR and the aerial bombardment of the rear areas of the USSR, many sports facilities were destroyed, damaged or ceased to operate, but after the war their restoration began. In the early 1950s, changes were made to the sports schools' program, as the USSR joined the Olympic Games in 1951. In 1953, there were 721 sports schools in the USSR.

Separate from these were two national sports universities under government operation: the Leningrad and Moscow Sports Institutes, which were the major sports institutions for adult level national athletes.

== Olympic Reserve specialized (complex) schools ==
After the USSR joined as a full member of the International Olympic Committee in 1951, Specialized Children and Youth (Sports) Schools of the Olympic Reserve (Russian: Специализированная Детско-Юношеская (Спортивная) Школа Олимпийского Резерва, СДЮ(С)ШОР) began to be opened to prepare young athletes for the sports of highest achievements. The number of such sports schools grew, as did the number of sports disciplines within sports schools. They included not only Olympic sports, but also national sports disciplines as well as tourism, orienteering, and other sports. As an alternative there is also Complex Specialized Children and Youth School of the Olympic Reserve (Ukrainian: Комплексна Спеціалізована Дитячо-Юнацька Школа Олімпійського Резерву, КСДЮШОР).

== Schools of Higher Sports Mastery ==
Aside of regular sports schools and specialized schools of Olympic Reserve, there are also schools of higher sports mastery (Ukrainian: Школа вищої спортивної майстерності, ШВСМ).

== Regional boarding schools of sports profile (Schools of Olympic Reserve) ==
Before 1989 in the Soviet Union existed a network of regional boarding schools of sports profile (Russian: ОШИСП, Областная школа-интернат спортивного профиля). Children live, study and receive advanced sports training there. Sports boarding schools can be either one-sport-oriented or multisports. In those schools children spend most of their time off studying practicing sports or perfecting certain skills. In 1989 all sports boarding schools were converted to schools of Olympic Reserve, UOR (Russian: училище олимпийского резерва, УОР).

== Structure ==
Sports schools were compatible with the administrative division of the country: there were District, City, Oblast, Central, Republican sports schools. To enter sports school, a child could have a recommendation from one's secondary school; children were also invited to come into a certain sports school for the selection during lessons in an ordinary school, or they could come for the selection on their own initiative. In accordance with specifics of different sports disciplines, the age of children and youth admitted into a sports school was between 8 and 14. Groups were organized according to ranks of athletes: there were separate groups for Second-Class Junior Sportsmen, First-Class Junior Sportsmen, Second-Class Sportsmen, First-Class Sportsmen, Candidates for Master of Sports of the USSR, Masters of Sports of the USSR. Term of study in each group was one to two years, with different sports normatives applied in each year.

== Popularity ==
By 1971 there were 3,813 sports schools in the USSR, with some 1.3 million children and youth training there. These included 2,434 schools with one million attendees under the jurisdiction of the system of education and 1,245 schools with 340,000 attendees functioning in the system of sports societies. And by 1991, some 6,000 sports schools functioned in the USSR.

== Criticism ==
Sports schools, especially the Olympic reserve ones have been in the spotlight of several scandals related to child abuse. In their strive to get the best out of children, a lot of coaches resort to verbal abuse as well as severe and sometimes sadistic physical punishments. The situation is even worse in sports boarding schools where parents exercise little control and children are fully under the coaches' authority.

Another disadvantage of this system is that much more attention is paid to sports than school education. Sports boarding schools of Olympic reserve received the sarcastic nickname "hit-and-run" (Russian: бей-беги; not be confused with a traffic accident or a baseball play), meaning that children mostly hit footballs and ran around sports fields instead of studying.

== Sports schools in post-Soviet states ==
After the break-up of the USSR, the system of children and youth sports in Russia passed through difficult times, but managed to retain the network of sports schools, and Physical Training Clubs (DYuKFP) were created in addition to them.

In 2005 some 4,951 sports schools and DYuKFPs functioned in the system of education and in the system of Rossport. To the former belonged 2,944 institutions of physical culture and sports education: 1,917 sports schools, 464 Specialized sports schools of the Olympic Reserve, 556 DYuKFPs and 7 centers for physical culture. Only sports schools of the system of education were attended by some 2 million children and youth, and they had more than 13,000 departments in 122 sports disciplines. Rossport institutions were attended by some one million young athletes.

== Sports schools in Asia ==
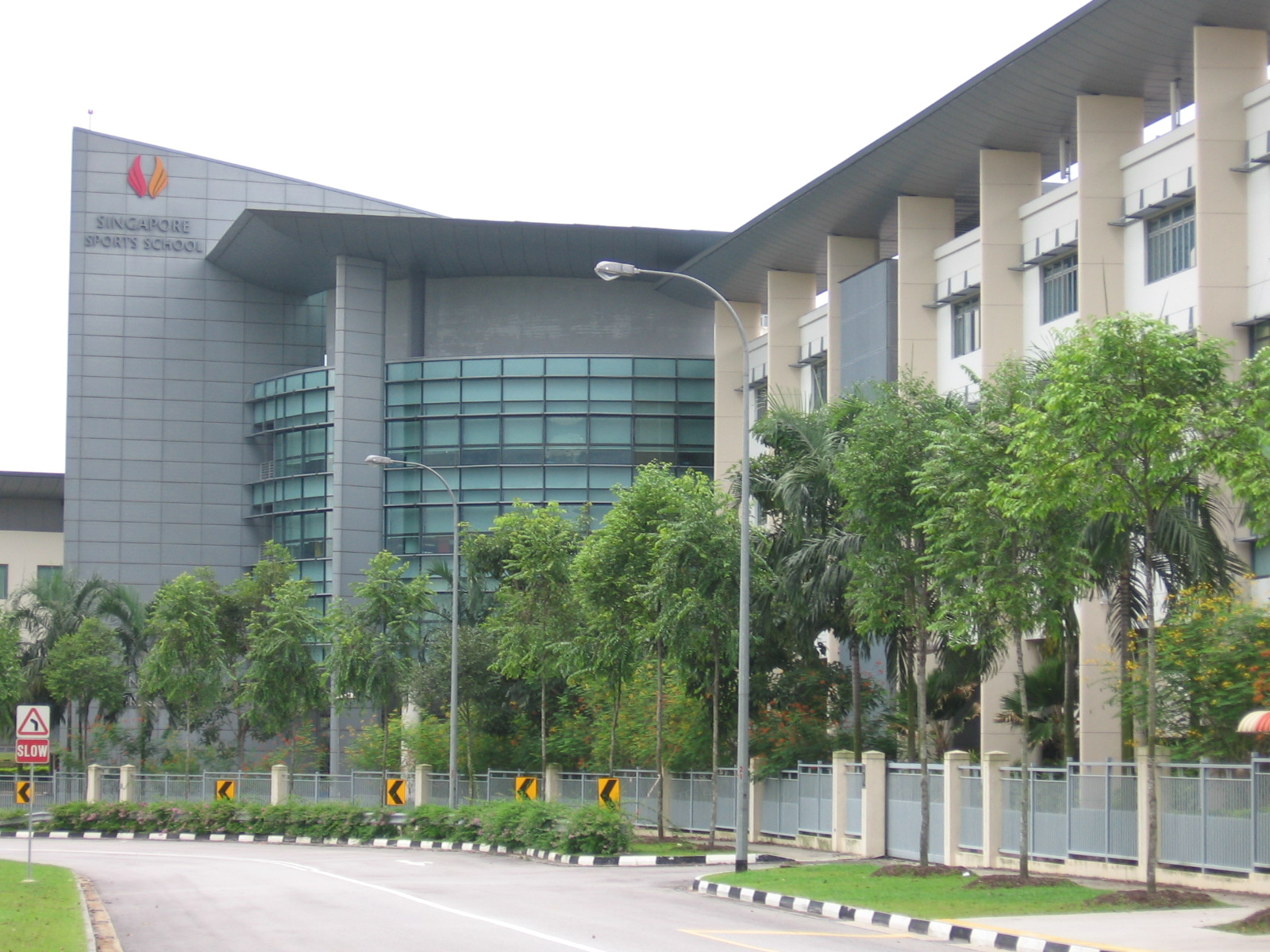
Singapore Sports School

Soviet experience of mass children and youth sports education was applied by Eastern Europe an countries, in particular East Germany, where they were called Kinder- und Jugendsportschule (KJS) for instance, Katarina Witt, Sven Fischer and Andreas Thom attended such schools. Similar sports schools were established in the People's Republic of China, North Korea and Cuba (called Schools for Sports Initiation there), allowing these countries to raise the level of sportsmen and achieve highest results at World Championships and Olympic Games.

At the present time some 3,000 sports schools exist in the People's Republic of China, including full-time ones, and this system is essentially based on the powerful system of sports schools of the USSR.

There are a number of sports schools in Asian countries. These include Singapore Sports School in Singapore, Bukit Jalil Sports School in Kuala Lumpur, Malaysia, and Hong Kong Sports Institute in Hong Kong.

== Australia ==
In New South Wales the state education system controls seven selective sports schools, with qualifying sports students coming in from much further distances than the usual local student catchment areas; Endeavour Sports High School, Hills Sports High School, Hunter Sports High School, Illawarra Sports High School, Narrabeen Sports High School, Matraville Sports High School and Westfields Sports High School. In Melbourne Victoria, Maribyrnong College is a public sports school. Darling Range Sports College in Forrestfield, Western Australia converted to a sports high school from a general high school. It is common for these schools to not be fully selective. Up to half their enrolment is reserved for local students who are not part of the sports programs.

Certain programs of the Australian Institute of Sport and their state equivalents could be considered as a sports school. Residential programs for Football and Basketball would take in teenage students on yearly scholarships that involved sporting and education requirements. Players to have gone through this system include Mark Viduka and Lauren Jackson who both attended at age 17 and went on to represent Australia in their respective sports at an international level. The gymnastics program took in even younger students, which included Philippe Rizzo, who was 14 years when he entered the AIS in 1995 before going on to represent Australia at the 2000 and 2004 Summer Olympics. He won several events at the 2002 Commonwealth Games.

== See also ==
- Voluntary Sports Societies of the Soviet Union
- Specialized schools in the Soviet Union
