= Roman Kagazezhev =

Russian footballer

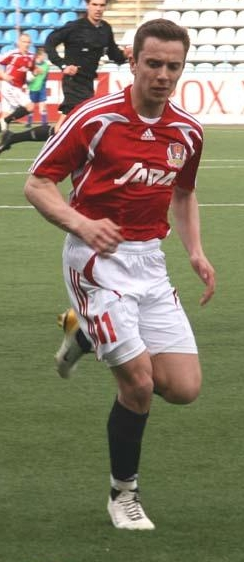
- Kagazezhev in 2007

Personal information
- Full name: Roman Valeryevich Kagazezhev
- Date of birth: 31 March 1980 (age 46)
- Place of birth: Velikiye Luki, Russian SFSR
- Height: 1.75 m (5 ft 9 in)
- Position: Midfielder

Senior career*
Years	Team	Apps	(Gls)
1997–1998	Energiya Velikiye Luki	56	(13)
1999–2000	Dynamo Moscow	1	(0)
1999–2000	→ Dynamo-d Moscow	27	(4)
2001	Kuban Krasnodar	3	(0)
2001	Arsenal Tula	14	(1)
2002–2003	Khimki	32	(3)
2004	Vostok Ust-Kamenogorsk	21	(8)
2005	Ventspils	3	(0)
2006	Baltika Kaliningrad	18	(2)
2007	Smolensk	9	(0)
2007	Zvezda Serpukhov	12	(1)
2008–2009	Vitebsk	13	(0)
- * Club domestic league appearances and goals

Roman Valeryevich Kagazezhev (Russian: Роман Валерьевич Кагазежев; born 31 March 1980) is a retired Russian professional football player.
