= Lesgaft National State University of Physical Education, Sport and Health =

University in St Petersburg, Russia

The Lesgaft National State University of Physical Education, Sport and Health
- Национальный государственный университет физической культуры, спорта и здоровья имени П. Ф. Лесгафта
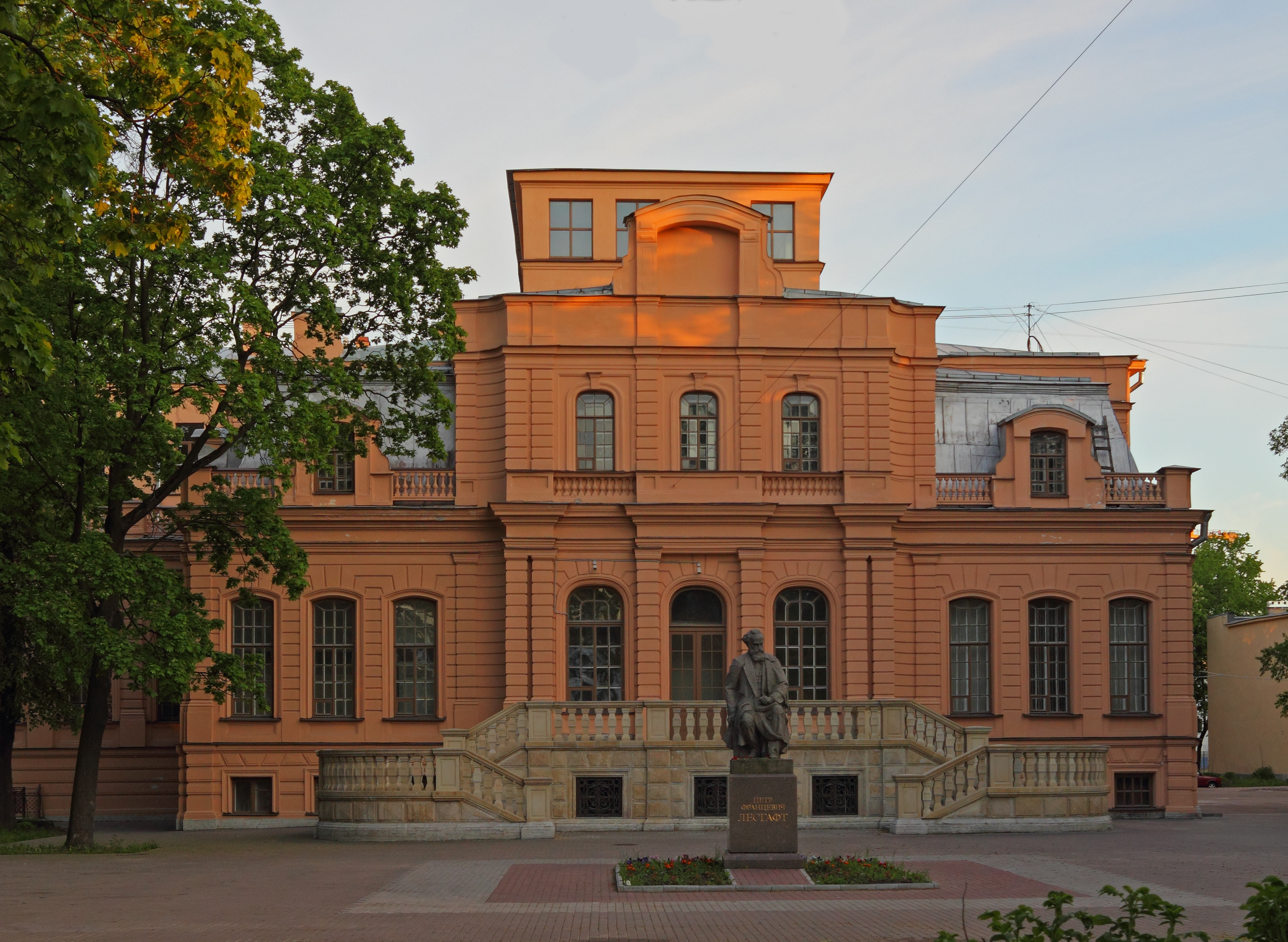
- Type: State
- Established: 1896
- President: Sergei I. Petrov
- Location: Saint Petersburg, Russia
- Campus: Urban
- Website: http://www.lesgaft.spb.ru

The Lesgaft National State University of Physical Education, Sport and Health is a university in St. Petersburg, Russia, named after Peter Lesgaft.

== History ==
Its history started from 1896, when Peter Lesgaft founded a training program for PE teachers.

It consists of following colleges:

- Institute of Adaptive Physical Culture
- Institute of Sports Facilities and Industries
- Institute of Economics and Social Technology
- Institute of International sports Programs
- Institute of Health and Sports Medicine

and the following faculties:

- Faculty Summer Olympic Sports
- Faculty of Winter Olympic Sports
- Faculty of non-Olympic sports
- Faculty of martial arts
- Faculty of Economics, Management and Law
- Faculty individual educational and sports technology
- Faculty of Basic Training
- Faculty profiled training
- Faculty training and retraining
- Faculty training of the teaching staff (postgraduate and doctoral studies)
- Faculty teaching and professional practice
- Faculty of Social Science and Humanities
- Preparatory Faculty

It is also the publisher of the magazine Scientific notes University Lesgaft and the newspaper Lesgaftovets ("For physical training cadres").

== Sports teams ==
A team representing this university was the runner-up for the first edition of the Soviet Cup in bandy in 1937.
