= Peter Lesgaft =

Russian physician (1837–1909)

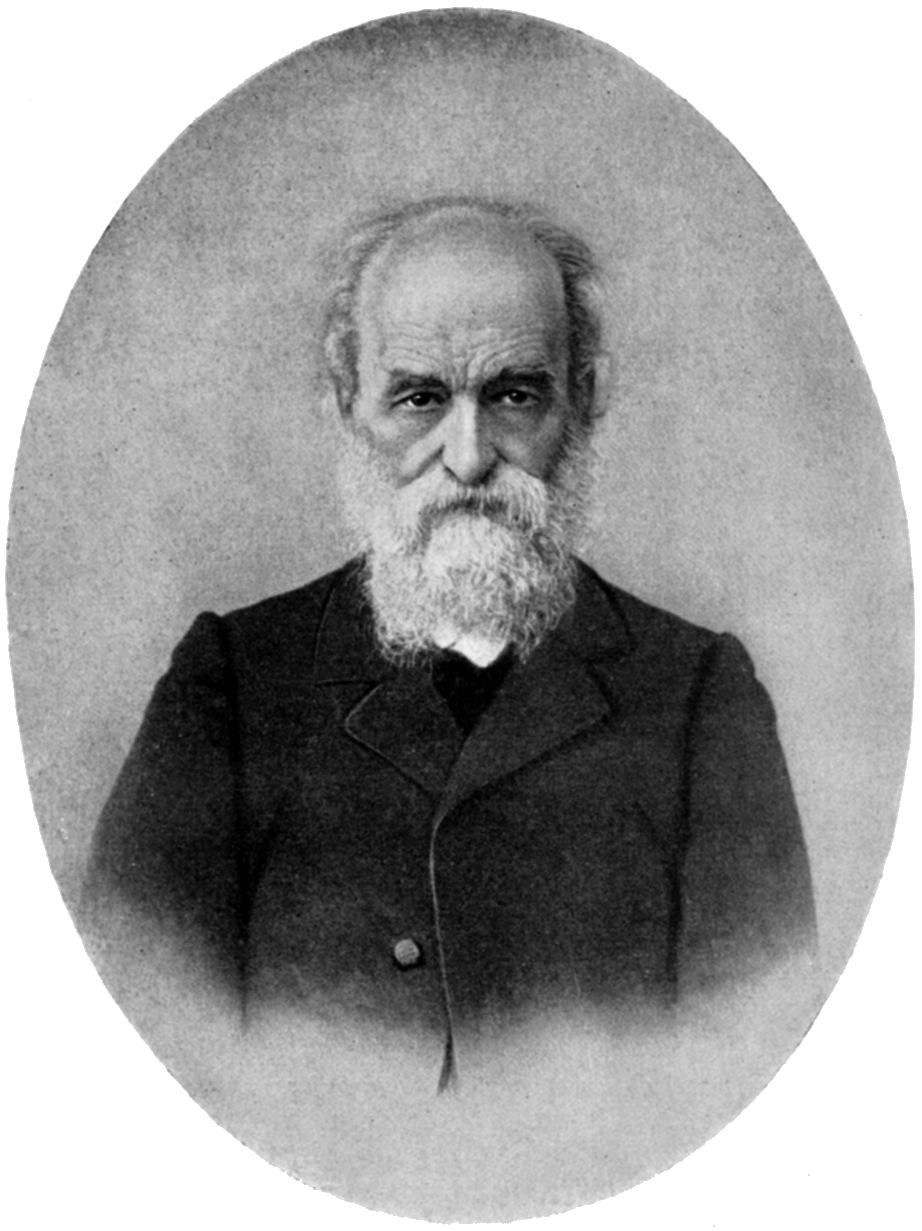
Peter Lesgaft

Peter Franzevich Lesgaft (Russian: Пётр Францевич Лесгафт; 21 September 1837 – 1909) was a Russian teacher, anatomist, physician and social reformer. He was the founder of the modern system of physical education and medical-pedagogical control in physical training, one of founders of theoretical anatomy. Lesgaft National State University of Physical Education, Sport and Health in St. Petersburg is named after him.

Unity and integrity of all organs in human body was the basis of Peter Lesgaft system of the pointed exercises for both physical development and intellectual, moral and aesthetic education.

Outdoor games were his favorite means in both physical development and formation of character of a child.

== Biography ==
Peter Lesgaft was born on 21 September 1837 in Saint Petersburg, the third son of a jeweler of German descent. In 1861 he graduated from Imperial Medical-Surgical Academy in St. Petersburg and remained there as a teacher of anatomy. In 1869 he became a professor at the University of Kazan, but soon was barred from teaching for his outspoken criticism of the unscientific methods used. In 1872 he became consultant on therapeutic gymnastics in the private practice of Dr. Berglindt. In 1872–1874 he supervised a group of Russian women for the first time allowed to employment in the Imperial Medical-Surgical Academy. He also became known for publication of a descriptive history of sport in Europe and ancient Greece and an article on naturalistic gymnastics. As a result, he was put in charge of the physical training of military cadets. In 1875, he was sponsored by the Russian Military Ministry to spend two summers in Western Europe, studying the systems of physical education. During that time he visited 26 cities in 13 European countries. He carefully studied British system, visiting English public schools, the Central Army Gymnastics School at Aldershot, the Royal Military Academy at Woolwich and Oxford University. In 1877, he published "Relationship of Anatomy to Physical Education" and "The Major Purpose of Physical Education in Schools". He was able to organizing courses for physical education instructors for the military academies — until then non-existent. In 1893 Peter Lesgaft organized Biological laboratory, which in 1918 was transformed into P. F. Lesgaft Institute of Natural Science.
