= Velikiye Luki =

Town in Pskov Oblast, Russia

Velikiye Luki Великие Луки
- Town
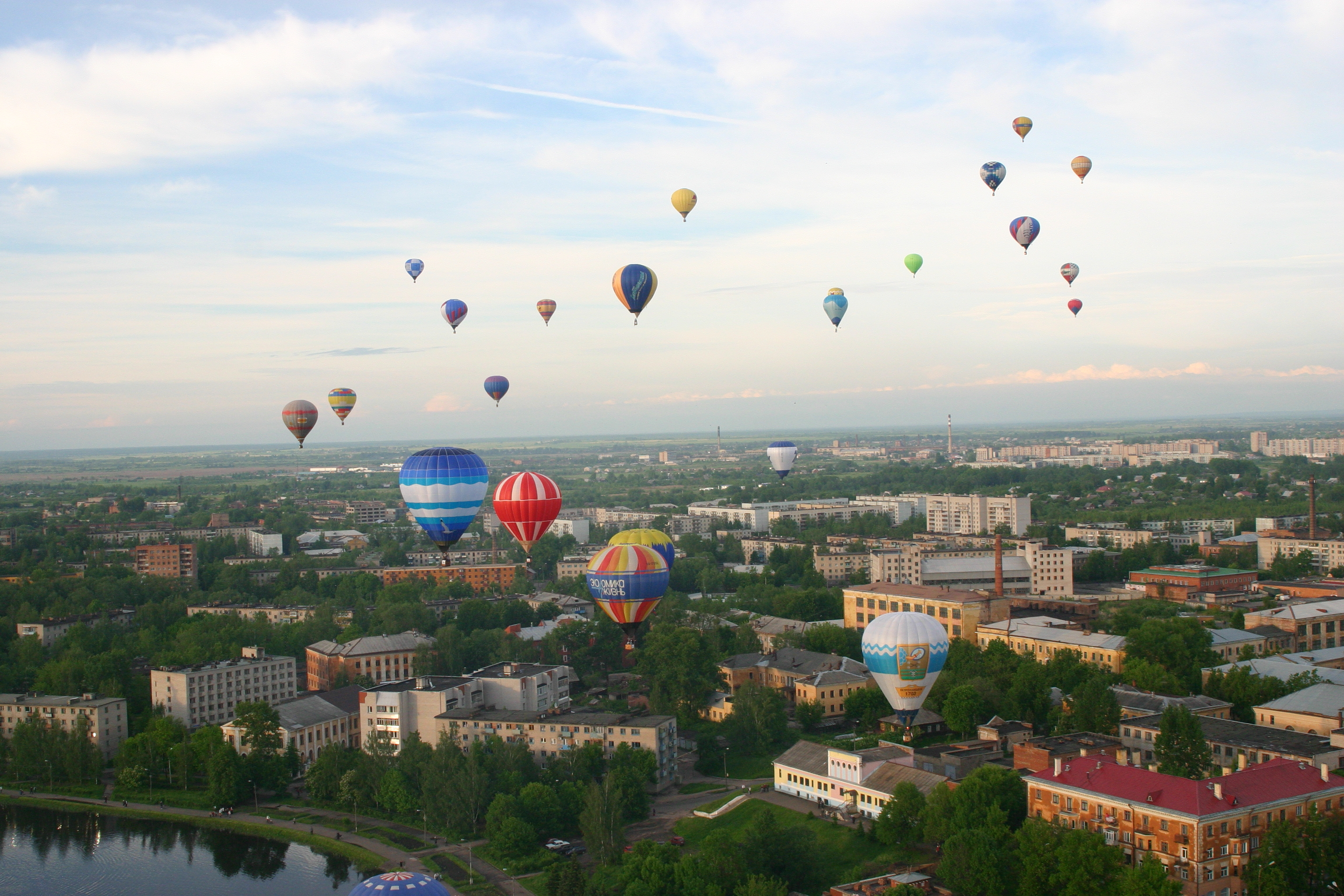
- Panorama of Velikiye Luki

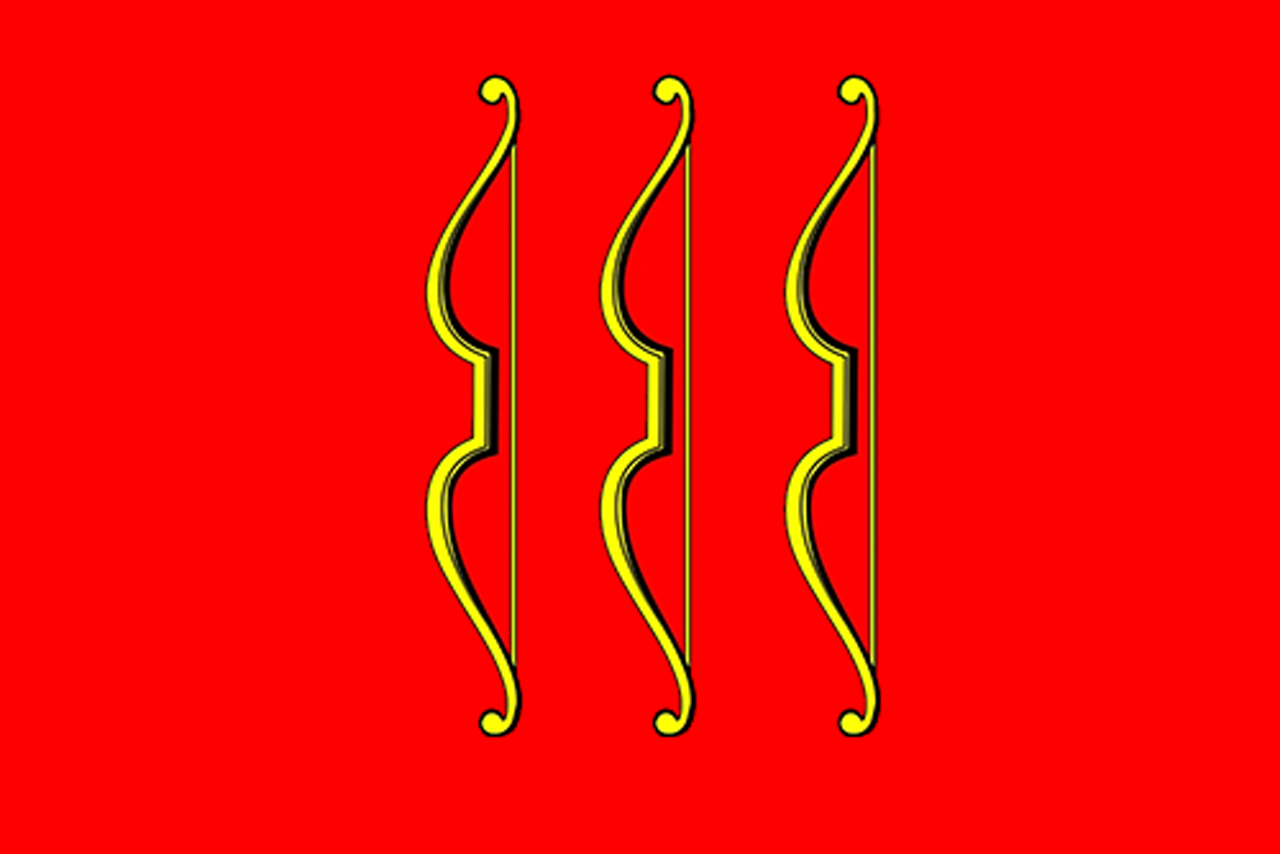
- Flag Coat of arms
- Interactive map of Velikiye Luki
- Location of Velikiye Luki Velikiye Luki (Pskov Oblast)
- Coordinates: 56°20′N 30°32′E
- Country: Russia
- Federal subject: Pskov Oblast
- First mentioned: 1166
- Town status since: 1777

Government
  - Body: City Duma
- Elevation: 100 m (330 ft)

Population (2010 Census)
  - Total: 98,778
  - Estimate (2025): 84,655 (−14.3%)
  - Rank: 169th in 2010

Administrative status
  - Subordinated to: Town of Velikiye Luki
  - Capital of: Velikoluksky District, Town of Velikiye Luki

Municipal status
  - Urban okrug: Velikiye Luki Urban Okrug
  - Capital of: Velikiye Luki Urban Okrug, Velikoluksky Municipal District
- Time zone: UTC+3 (MSK)
- Postal code: 182100-182115
- Dialing code: +7 81153
- OKTMO ID: 58710000001
- Website: vluki.reg60.ru

Velikiye Luki (Russian: Вели́кие Лу́ки, IPA: [vʲɪˈlʲikʲɪjə ˈlukʲɪ]; lit. great meanders or longbows) is a town in Pskov Oblast, Russia, located on the meandering Lovat River. It is the second largest town in Pskov Oblast; population: 86,711 (2021 census); 98,778 (2010 census); 104,979 (2002 census); 113,745 (1989 Soviet census). Velikiye Luki is a City of Military Glory, an honor bestowed on it because of the courage and heroism its citizens displayed during World War II.

Historical population
Year	Pop.	±%
1897	8,500	—
1926	19,600	+130.6%
1939	34,932	+78.2%
1959	58,939	+68.7%
1970	85,994	+45.9%
1979	103,045	+19.8%
1989	113,235	+9.9%
2002	104,979	−7.3%
2010	98,778	−5.9%
2021	86,711	−12.2%
Source: Census data

== History ==
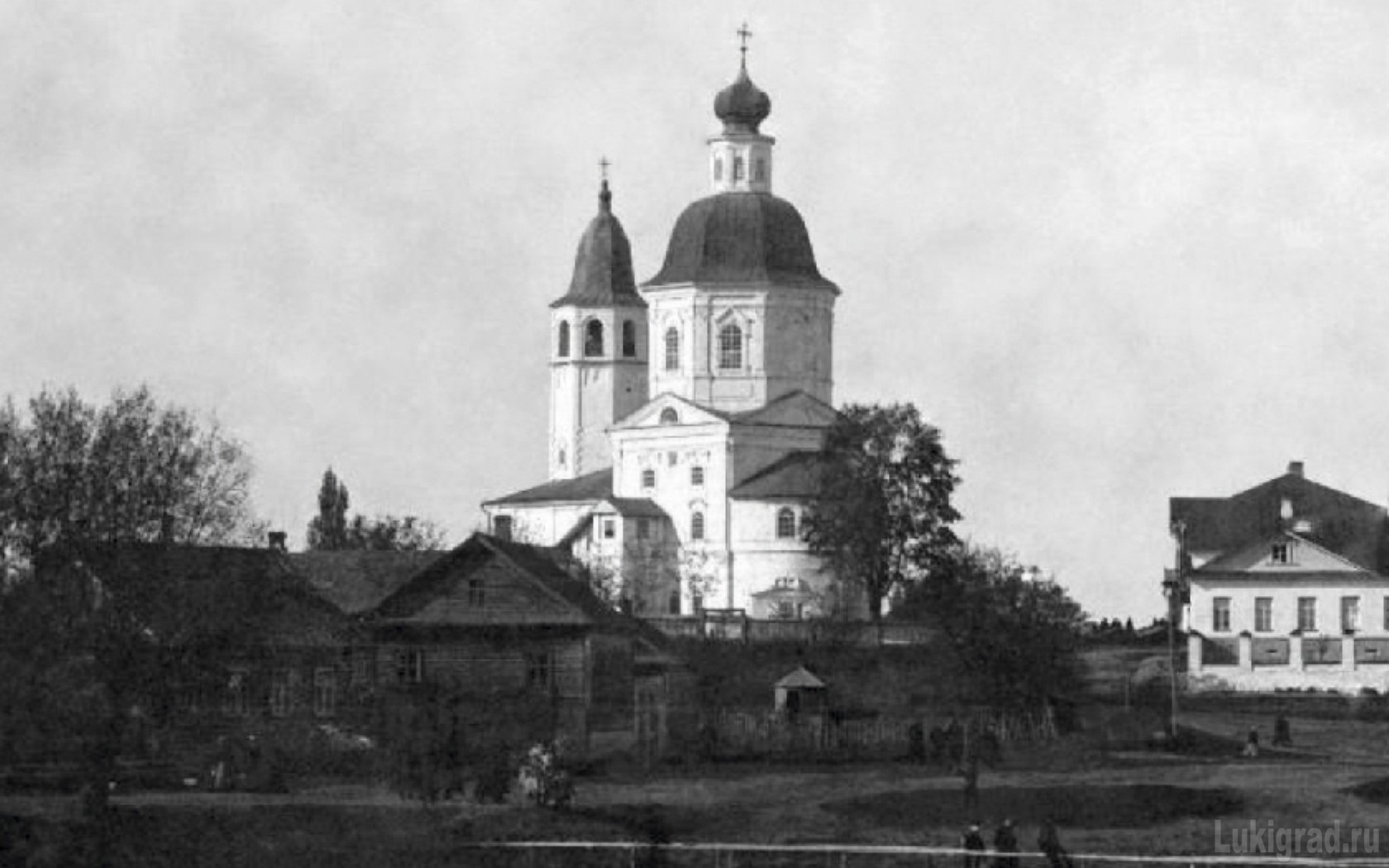
Church of St. Paraskeva in the early 20th century

Velikiye Luki is first mentioned in a chronicle under the year of 1166 as Luki. From the 12th century, Luki was a part of the Novgorod Republic. After the construction of a fortress in 1211, Luki gained strategic importance, defending the approaches to Pskov and Novgorod. It was located near the border with Lithuania. The adjective Velikiye in the name first appeared in the early 15th century. It was incorporated into the Grand Duchy of Moscow by Ivan the Great in 1478. During the Livonian War, it played an important role. It was besieged and captured by Polish-Lithuanian King Stephen Báthory in 1580, and remained under Polish control until 1582.

In the course of the administrative reform carried out in 1708 by Peter the Great, Velikiye Luki was included into Ingermanland Governorate (known since 1710 as Saint Petersburg Governorate). It was explicitly mentioned as one of the towns the governorate comprised. In 1727, separate Novgorod Governorate was split off, and in 1772, Pskov Governorate (which between 1777 and 1796 existed as Pskov Viceroyalty) was established. After 1777, Velikiye Luki was the seat of Velikolutsky Uyezd (later known as Velikoluksky Uyezd). At the beginning of the 20th century, it evolved into an important railway hub following the construction of the railway connecting Moscow with Riga.

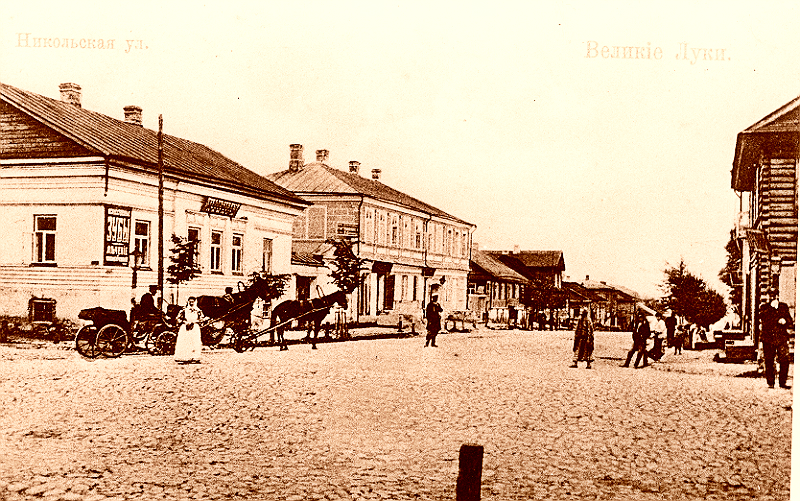
Early-20th-century view of the town

On 1 August 1927, the uyezds were abolished, and Velikoluksky District was established, with the administrative center in Velikiye Luki. Pskov Governorate was abolished as well, Velikiye Luki was the center of Velikiye Luki Okrug of Leningrad Oblast. On 17 June 1929 the okrug was transferred to Western Oblast. On 23 July 1930 the okrugs were also abolished. On 29 January 1935 Western Oblast was abolished, and the district was transferred to Kalinin Oblast, and on 5 February that year Velikiye Luki became the center of Velikiye Luki Okrug of Kalinin Oblast, one of the okrugs abutting the state boundaries of the Soviet Union. On 4 May 1938 the okrug was abolished again.

From 19 to 21 July 1941 and again from 25 August 1941 to 17 January 1943, Velikiye Luki was occupied by German troops. During World War II, in 1941 and 1942, fighting took place in the vicinity between German and Soviet forces. In 1942, the Germans established a forced labour camp in the city. During the Battle for Velikiye Luki (in late 1942), a German force of about 20,000 was surrounded in the town which had been turned into a fortress. After months of heavy fighting, the German defenders were finally defeated and Velikiye Luki was liberated by the troops of the 3rd Shock Army of the Kalinin Front of the Red Army on 17 January 1943. The town was almost completely destroyed.

A significant portion of the Soviet forces fighting for Velikiye Luki consisted of Estonians conscripted into the Red Army, and approximately 6000 of them died liberating the town. The railroad system in Velikiye Luki was the target of a mass air raid on 19 July 1944 by Heinkel He 177 heavy bomber aircraft, the only documented mass raid utilizing this model of aircraft. Many streets are named after the heroes of the War. One such street is named after Yelizaveta Chaikina.

On 22 August 1944 Velikiye Luki Oblast was established, with the administrative center in Velikiye Luki. On 2 October 1957 Velikiye Luki Oblast was abolished, and Velikiye Luki was transferred to Pskov Oblast as the town of oblast significance.

=== 850th celebration ===
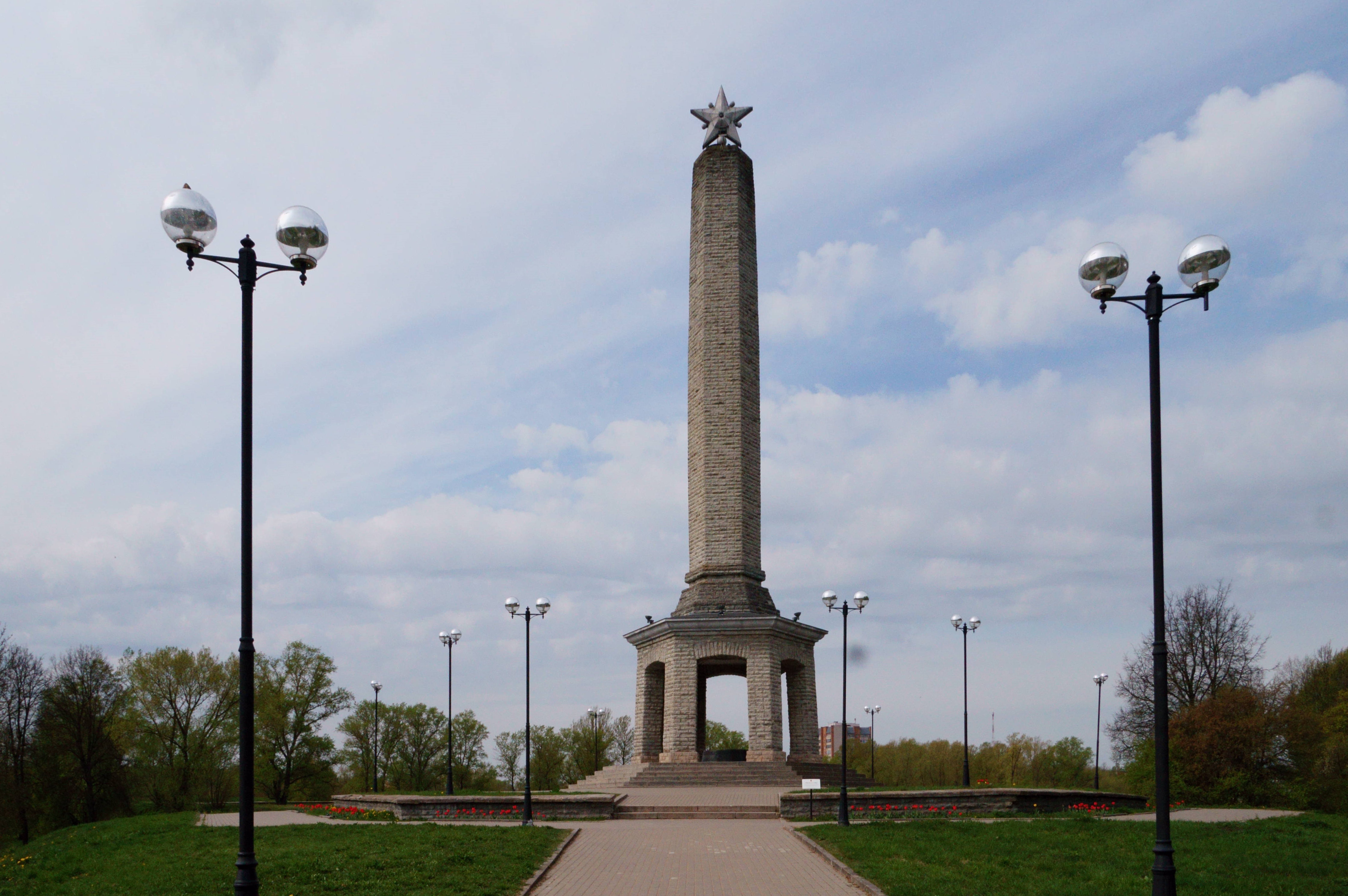
The obelisk of glory in the former Velikiye Luki fortress

In 2016, Velikiye Luki celebrated the 850th anniversary of the town's first appearance on historical sources, which is dated to 1166.

The town marked the event with festivals and historical exhibitions, as well as making long-term improvements. In 2013, town planners began the preparations to improve the infrastructure and quality of life for residents. Russian Prime Minister Dmitry Medvedev offered federal support to the anniversary, and recommended the Ministry of Transport fund a much-needed overpass connecting the two busiest parts of Velikiye Luki. The majority (70%) of the buildings in the town, including the schools, were built in the 1950s and 1960s and needed modernisation. New sports and leisure facilities were needed. Town officials stated the overall aim is to preserve the historical aspects of the city.

Among the improvements planned was the remodel of a large obelisk in Jubilee Square, which was erected on the city's 800th anniversary in 1966 but never finished (and had been dubbed a "white elephant"). A contest was held to solicit designs for the remodel of the obelisk, as well as logos and slogans for the festivities. The winning design for the obelisk features elements symbolising the town's history, including Viking and Greek features.

== Administrative and municipal status ==
Within the framework of administrative divisions, it serves as the administrative center of Velikoluksky District, even though it is not a part of it. As an administrative division, it is incorporated separately as the Town of Velikiye Luki—an administrative unit with the status equal to that of the districts. As a municipal division, the Town of Velikiye Luki is incorporated as Velikiye Luki Urban Okrug and serves as the administrative center of Velikoluksky Municipal District.

== Economy ==
=== Industry ===
Velikiye Luki is an industrial city, with several enterprises in machine building industry. They produce machines for timber industry, electrotechnical equipment, and batteries. There is a workshop to repair railway carriages and locomotives. There are also enterprises of timber, textile, and food industries, as well as production of brickstones. Food industry in 2010 was responsible for production of 24.8% of all industrial output, and electrotechnical industry produced 15% of the output.

=== Transportation ===
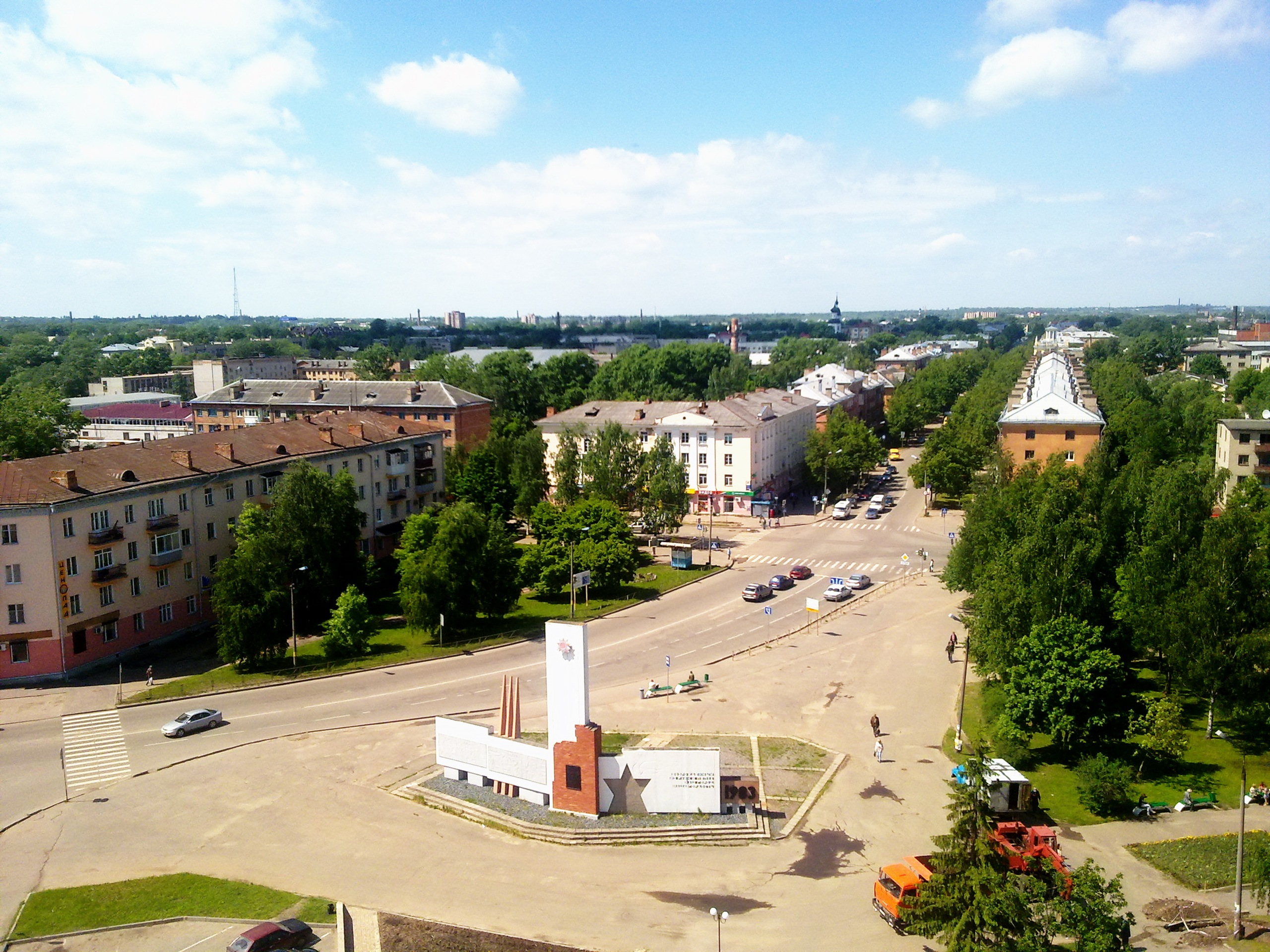
Kalinin Square

Velikiye Luki is an important railway hub. One railway connects Moscow via Velikiye Luki with Riga and runs in the east–west direction. Another railway, running to the northwest, connects Velikiye Luki via Toropets and Ostashkov with Bologoye. One more railway connects Velikiye Luki to Nevel, where it splits into two railway lines, both running southeast into Belarus: One line to Vitebsk, and another one to Grodno via Polotsk and Molodechno.

The M9 highway which connects Moscow and Riga bypasses Velikiye Luki, which has an access to the highway. Other roads connect Velikiye Luki with Novosokolniki, with Nevel, and with Porkhov via Loknya. There are also local roads.

The town is served by the Velikiye Luki Airport.

== Culture and recreation ==
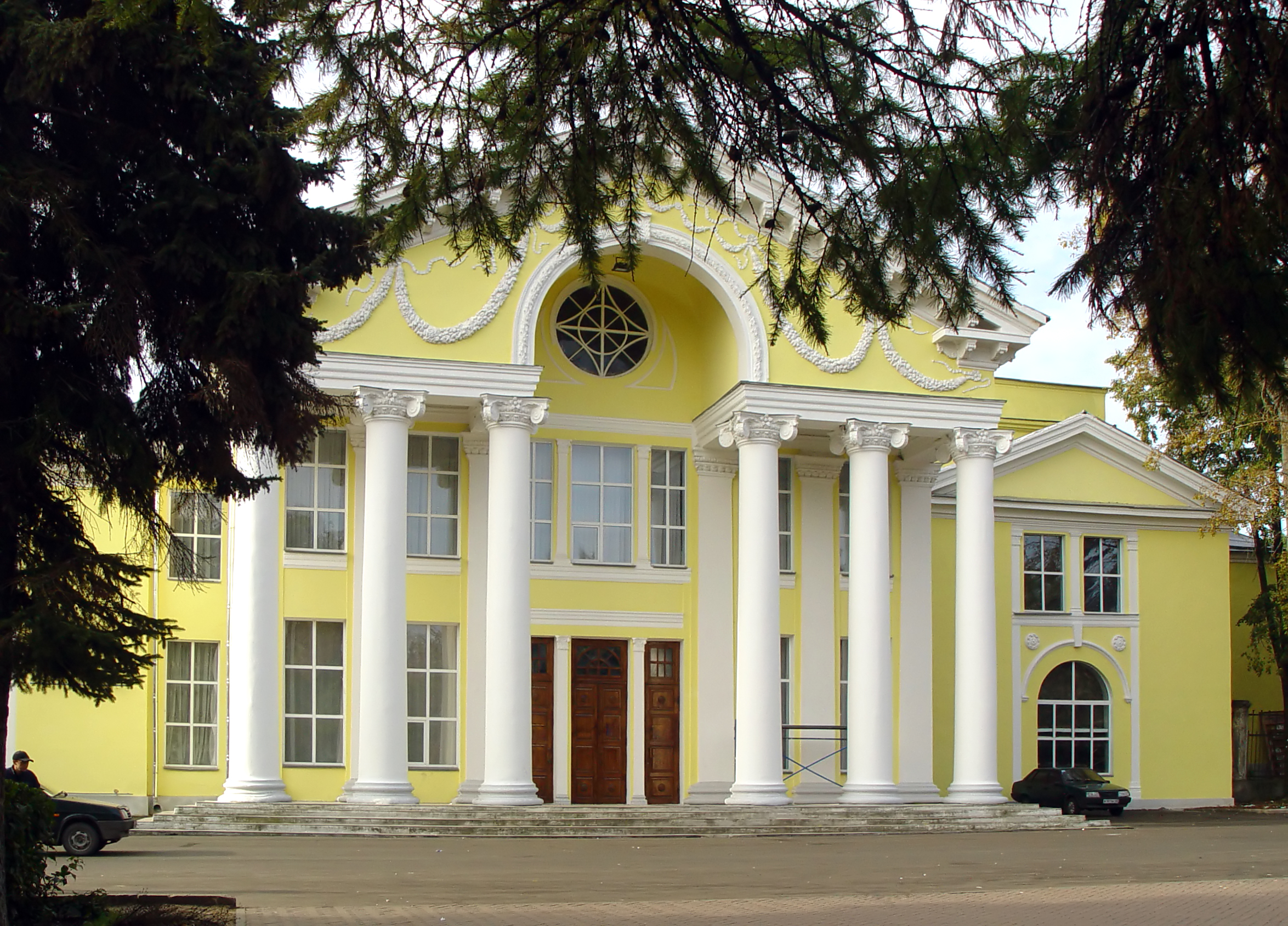
Drama Theatre

The district contains seven objects classified as cultural and historical heritage of federal significance and thirty-three monuments of local significance. The federal monuments include the Kazan Church built in the 19th century, and the ramparts, the oldest of which originate from the 12th century.

The two museums in Velikiye Luki are the Velikiye Luki Local Museum, which exhibits collections of local interest, and Ivan Vinogradov Museum-House, located in the house which belonged to the parents of mathematician Ivan Vinogradov. The house was restored in the 1970s with the help of Vinogradov himself. He lived here before moving to study in Saint Petersburg.

== Education ==
There are several institutions of higher education in the city:

- State Agricultural Academy of Velikie Luki,
- Velikiye Luki State Academy of Physical Education and Sports,
- branch of St. Petersburg State Transport University,
- branch of Pskov State University.

== Sports ==
Velikiye Luki is notable for ballooning competitions, which are held in the town annually since 1996. Since 1999, the competitions have been internationally recognized.

== Climate ==
Velikye Luki has warm summer humid continental climate, Köppen: Dfb.

Climate data for Velikiye Luki (1991–2020, extremes 1889–present)
Month	Jan	Feb	Mar	Apr	May	Jun	Jul	Aug	Sep	Oct	Nov	Dec	Year
Record high °C (°F)	10.7 (51.3)	9.3 (48.7)	20.8 (69.4)	27.7 (81.9)	33.0 (91.4)	33.6 (92.5)	35.7 (96.3)	36.2 (97.2)	30.0 (86.0)	28.0 (82.4)	15.8 (60.4)	10.9 (51.6)	36.2 (97.2)
Mean daily maximum °C (°F)	−2.9 (26.8)	−2.5 (27.5)	3.3 (37.9)	11.6 (52.9)	18.2 (64.8)	21.2 (70.2)	23.4 (74.1)	21.8 (71.2)	15.9 (60.6)	9.4 (48.9)	2.1 (35.8)	−1.9 (28.6)	10.0 (50.0)
Daily mean °C (°F)	−5.5 (22.1)	−6 (21)	−0.9 (30.4)	6.2 (43.2)	12.4 (54.3)	15.9 (60.6)	18.0 (64.4)	16.3 (61.3)	11.0 (51.8)	5.9 (42.6)	−0.2 (31.6)	−4.2 (24.4)	5.7 (42.3)
Mean daily minimum °C (°F)	−8.6 (16.5)	−9.8 (14.4)	−4.8 (23.4)	1.3 (34.3)	6.5 (43.7)	10.5 (50.9)	12.5 (54.5)	11.2 (52.2)	6.8 (44.2)	2.6 (36.7)	−2.5 (27.5)	−7 (19)	1.6 (34.9)
Record low °C (°F)	−45.7 (−50.3)	−39.3 (−38.7)	−34.4 (−29.9)	−20.4 (−4.7)	−6.9 (19.6)	−1.3 (29.7)	1.7 (35.1)	−2.7 (27.1)	−8.2 (17.2)	−17.3 (0.9)	−30.3 (−22.5)	−42.3 (−44.1)	−45.7 (−50.3)
Average precipitation mm (inches)	39 (1.5)	33 (1.3)	33 (1.3)	32 (1.3)	51 (2.0)	84 (3.3)	78 (3.1)	81 (3.2)	67 (2.6)	56 (2.2)	44 (1.7)	42 (1.7)	640 (25.2)
Average snowfall cm (inches)	12 (4.7)	16 (6.3)	11 (4.3)	5 (2.0)	0.3 (0.1)	0.1 (0.0)	0 (0)	0 (0)	0.3 (0.1)	1 (0.4)	2 (0.8)	8 (3.1)	55.7 (21.8)
Average rainy days	6	4	8	11	14	16	15	14	16	15	11	6	136
Average snowy days	21	19	12	5	0.3	0.1	0	0	0.3	3	12	20	93
Average relative humidity (%)	84	81	76	69	69	75	77	79	83	84	86	86	79
Mean monthly sunshine hours	37.2	67.2	133.3	180.0	286.8	273.0	257.3	248.0	172.5	102.3	34.5	15.5	1,807.6
Source 1: Pogoda.ru.net
Source 2: Climatebase (sun, 1881–2008)

== People ==
Velikiye Luki has been claimed as the birthplace of Soviet Marshal Konstantin Rokossovsky. The Hero of the Soviet Union Alexander Matrosov is buried in this city. Modest Mussorgsky's memorial house in Kunyinsky District, standing on the bank of a large picturesque lake, is within easy range of the town.

Other people from Velikiye Luki include:

- Alexandra Burchenkova (born 1988), road racing cyclist
- Roman Kagazezhev (born 1980), professional football player
- German Lovchev (born 1981), professional footballer
- Andrei Lukanchenkov (born 1986), professional footballer
- Oleg Marichev (born 1945), mathematician
- Viktor Safronov (1917–1999), astronomer
- Genrikh Fedosov (1932–2005), football player
- Sergey Firsanov (born 1982), professional road bicycle racer
- Allan Erdman (born 1933), retired Soviet shooter
- Dmitri Alenichev (born 1972), football coach, former player and politician

== Twin towns and sister cities ==
Velikiye Luki was formally twinned with:

- Maardu, Estonia
- Seinäjoki, Finland

== Sources ==
- Псковское областное Собрание депутатов. Закон №833-оз от 5 февраля 2009 г. «Об административно-территориальном устройстве Псковской области». Вступил в силу со дня официального опубликования. Опубликован: "Псковская правда", №20, 10 февраля 2009 г. (Pskov Oblast Council of Deputies. Law #833-oz of February 5, 2009 On the Administrative-Territorial Structure of Pskov Oblast. Effective as of the official publication date.).
- Псковское областное Собрание депутатов. Закон №419-оз от 28 февраля 2005 г. «О границах и статусе действующих на территории области муниципальных образований». Вступил в силу со дня официального опубликования. Опубликован: "Псковская правда", №41–43, 4 марта 2005 г. (Pskov Oblast Council of Deputies. Law #419-ы. of February 28, 2005 On the Borders and Status of the Municipal Formations Existing on the Oblast Territory. Effective as of the official publication date.).
- Griehl, Manfred. Heinkel He 177 'Greif': The only long-range bomber in Luftwaffe service. Erlangen, Germany: AirDOC 2008. ISBN 978-3-93568-747-8.
