= Presidential Physics and Mathematics Lyceum No. 239 =

Coordinates: 59.945°N 30.351°E

Location
- Kirochnaya st., 8a Saint Petersburg; Russia

Information
- Type: Lyceum
- Established: 1918
- Principal: Maxim Yakovlevich Pratusevich
- Grades: 5–11
- Colors: Blue, silver, gold
- Website: www.239.ru

Presidential Physics and Mathematics Lyceum No. 239 (Russian: Президентский физико-математический лицей №239), is a public high school in Saint Petersburg, Russia that specializes in mathematics and physics. The school opened in 1918 and it became a specialized city school in 1961. The school is noted for its strong academic programs. It is the alma mater of numerous winners of International Mathematical Olympiads and it has produced many notable alumni. The lyceum has been named the best school in Russia in 2015, 2016, and 2017.

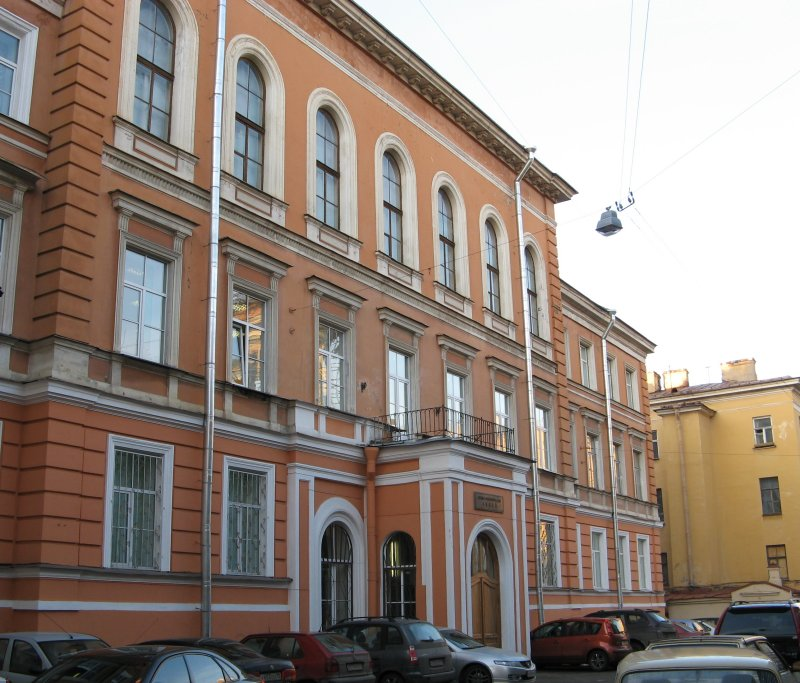
Saint Petersburg Lyceum 239, January 2008

== History ==
The school was founded in 1918. Originally, it was located in the Lobanov-Rostovsky Palace, also known as "the house with lions" at the corner of Saint Isaac's Square and Admiralteysky Prospect. It was one of only a handful of schools to remain open during the Siege of Leningrad. In 1961 the school was granted the status of the city's school with specialization in physics and mathematics. In 1964 the school moved to the building on Kazansky Street 48/1, which was previously occupied by a school of working youth, and in 1966 it moved again to Moika River, 108. Finally, in 1975 the school relocated to its current location, into the historic Annenschule building. In 1990, the Russian Ministry of Education granted the school the status of physico-mathematical lyceum and experimental laboratory for standard of education in physics, mathematics and informatics in Saint Petersburg. In 1994, the school won the George Soros grant. The US Mathematical society voted the school as one of the top ten schools of former Soviet Union. On the first of January 2014 the school received the status of "Presidential Physics and Mathematics Lyceum №239".

== Notable alumni ==
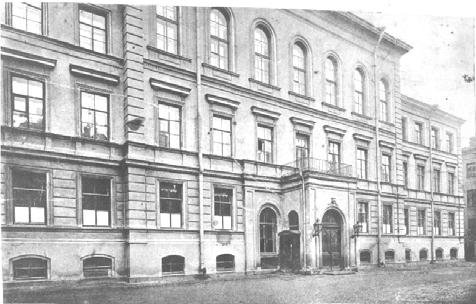
Annenschule gymnasium in 1912.

- Yelena Bonner (1940) – human rights activist (widow of Andrei Sakharov)
- Leonid Kharitonov – actor
- Alisa Freindlich (c. 1942 – 1953) – major Russian movie and theater actress
- Yuri Matiyasevich (1962–1963) – mathematician who solved Hilbert's tenth problem
- Andrei Tolubeyev (?–1963) – theatrical and cinema actor, People's Artist of Russia
- Natalia Kuchinskaya (1964–1966) – Olympic champion in gymnastics (Mexico City, 1968), the first of a number of young gymnastics champions
- Boris Grebenshchikov (1968–1970) – rock musician, who is one of the "founding fathers" of Russian rock music
- Mikhail Zurabov (?–1970) – minister of health of the Russian Federation, chair of the Russian pension fund administration
- Sergey Fursenko – businessman, president of the football club Zenit Saint Petersburg
- Grigori Perelman (1980–1982) – mathematician who was awarded Fields Medal for his proof of the Poincaré conjecture
- Alexander Khalifman (1981–1983) – FIDE World Chess champion in 1999
- Stanislav Smirnov (1985–1987) – mathematician and recipient of Fields Medal in 2010 for his work on the mathematical foundations of statistical physics, particularly finite lattice models
- Yoel Matveyev (1990-?) – Yiddish poet, writer and journalist

== Directors of the School ==
- Matkovskaya Maria Vasilievna - from 1950 to 1976
- Radionov Victor Evseevich - from 1976 to 1980
- Golubeva Galina Nikolaevna - from 1980 to 1982
- Efimova Tamara Borisovna - from 1982 to 2009
- Pratusevich Maxim Yakovlevich - since 2009
