= Blue Water Sailing =

- Editor: George Day
- Managing Editor: Valerie Meffert
- Categories: Cruising
- Frequency: Monthly
- Publisher: Blue Water Sailing Inc
- First issue: 1996
- Company: Blue Water Group
- Country: United States
- Based in: Rhode Island
- Language: English
- Website: www.bwsailing.com

Blue Water Sailing is a magazine for blue water sailors. It was founded in 1996 by George and Rosa Day, who spent five years sailing their Mason 43 ketch around the world. The magazine is sold in 67 countries. The supplement Multihulls Quarterly is included four times a year.

The magazine's parent company, Blue Water Media, also publishes "Cruising Compass," a free weekly e-newsletter.
