= Yuri Aleksandrovich Brychkov =

Russian mathematician

Yury Aleksandrovich Brychkov
- Юрий Александрович Брычков
- Born: 29 February 1944 (age 82); Moscow, USSR
- Education: Moscow State University
- Known for: Tables of Series, Special Functions, Integral Transforms
- Scientific career
- Fields: Mathematics
- Doctoral advisor: Yuri Mikhailovich Shirokov

Yury Aleksandrovich Brychkov (Russian: Юрий Александрович Брычков; born 29 February 1944 in Moscow, Russia) is a Russian mathematician.

He graduated from Moscow State University in 1966 and worked on quantum field theory at the Steklov Mathematical Institute of the Russian Academy of Sciences, under the supervision of Yuri Mikhailovich Shirokov. He received his PhD in 1971 and he has been with the Dorodnicyn Computing Centre of the Russian Academy of Sciences since 1969.

Yu. A. Brychkov has worked on various topics of pure mathematics, and he has made contributions to the fields of special functions and integral transforms. He has also worked on the computer implementation of special functions at the University of Waterloo, Maplesoft, and Wolfram Research. He is a founding editor of the Journal of Integral Transforms and Special Functions, and has authored a number of handbooks, including the five volume Integrals and Series (Gordon and Breach Science Publishers, 1986–1992).

== Works ==
- Brychkov, Yu. A.; Prudnikov, A. P. (1989). Integral transformations of generalized functions. New York-London: Gordon & Breach Science Publishers / CRC Press. New York-London. ISBN 2-88124-705-9. (342 pages)
- Brychkov, Yu. A.; Marichev, O. I.; Prudnikov, A. P. (1989). Tables of indefinite integrals. New York-London: Gordon & Breach Science Publishers / CRC Press. New York-London. ISBN 2-88124-710-5. (192 pages)
- Prudnikov, A. P.; Brychkov, Yu. A.; Marichev, O. I. Integraly i ryady Интегралы и ряды [Integrals and series] (in Russian). Vol. Set 1-3 (1 ed.). Nauka (Наука). Moscow. 1981−1986.
- Prudnikov, A. P.; Brychkov, Yu. A.; Marichev, O. I. Integrals and series. Vol. Set 1-5. Gordon & Breach Science Publishers / CRC Press. New York-London. 1986−1992.

- Prudnikov, A. P.; Brychkov, Yu. A.; Marichev, O. I. (1986). Integrals and Series. Vol. 1: Elementary Functions. Gordon & Breach Science Publishers / CRC Press. New York-London. ISBN 978-2-88124-089-8. OCLC 916363878. (798 pages)
- Prudnikov, A. P.; Brychkov, Yu. A.; Marichev, O. I. (1986). Integrals and Series. Vol. 2: Special functions. Gordon & Breach Science Publishers / CRC Press. New York-London. ISBN 978-2-88124-090-4. OCLC 50653126. (750 pages.)
- Prudnikov, A. P.; Brychkov, Yu. A.; Marichev, O. I. (1990). Integrals and Series. Vol. 3: More special functions. Gordon & Breach Science Publishers / CRC Press. New York-London. ISBN 978-2-88124-682-1. OCLC 916363880. (800 pages.)
- Prudnikov, A. P.; Brychkov, Yu. A.; Marichev, O. I. (1992). Integrals and Series. Vol. 4: Direct Laplace Transforms. Gordon & Breach Science Publishers / CRC Press. New York-London. OCLC 63722509. (Second printing: 1998.) (xviii+618 pages.)
- Prudnikov, A. P.; Brychkov, Yu. A.; Marichev, O. I. (1992). Integrals and Series. Vol. 5: Inverse Laplace Transforms. Gordon & Breach Science Publishers / CRC Press. New York-London. ISBN 2-88124838-1. OCLC 489706146. (xx+595 pages.)

- Brychkov, Yu. A.; Glaeske, H.-Ju.; Prudnikov, A. P.; Vu Kim, Tuan (1992). Multidimensional integral transformations. Gordon & Breach Science Publishers / CRC Press. New York-London. ISBN 2-88124-839-X. (386 pages)
- Prudnikov, A. P.; Brychkov, Yu. A.; Marichev, O. I. (2003). Integraly i ryady Интегралы и ряды [Integrals and series] (in Russian). Vol. Set 1-3 (2nd revised ed.). Fizmatlit (Физматлит). ISBN 978-5-9221-0322-0.

- Prudnikov, A. P.; Brychkov, Yu. A.; Marichev, O. I. (2003). Integraly i ryady Интегралы и ряды [Integrals and series: Elementary functions] (in Russian). Vol. 1: Elementarnye funktsii (Элементарные функции) (2nd revised ed.). Fizmatlit (Физматлит). Moscow. ISBN 978-5-9221-0323-7. OCLC 937142305. (630 pages)
- Prudnikov, A. P.; Brychkov, Yu. A.; Marichev, O. I. (2003). Integraly i ryady Интегралы и ряды [Integrals and series: Special functions] (in Russian). Vol. 2: Spetsialnye funktsii (Специальные функции) (2nd revised ed.). Fizmatlit (Физматлит). Moscow. ISBN 978-5-9221-0324-4. (663 pages)
- Prudnikov, A. P.; Brychkov, Yu. A.; Marichev, O. I. (2003). Integraly i ryady Интегралы и ряды [Integrals and series: Special functions. Further chapters.] (in Russian). Vol. 3: Spetsialnye funktsii. Dopolnitelnye glavy (2nd revised ed.). Fizmatlit (Физматлит). Moscow. ISBN 978-5-9221-0325-1. (710 pages)

- Brychkov, Yu. A. (2008). Handbook of special functions. Derivatives, integrals, series and other formulas. CRC Press. Boca Raton. ISBN 978-1-58488-956-4. (xx+680 pages)
- Brychkov, Yu. A.; Marichev, O. I.; Savischenko., N. V. (2018). Handbook of Mellin Transforms. CRC Press. Boca Raton. ISBN 978-1-13835-335-0. (xx+587 pages)
