= Igor Yefimov (philosopher) =

US philosopher (1937–2020)

Igor Markovich Yefimov or Igor Efimov (Russian: И́горь Ма́ркович Ефи́мов; August 8, 1937 – August 12, 2020) was an American philosopher, historian, writer and publisher of Russian origin. Some of his works were published under the pen name Andrei Moscovit. Together with Boris Vakhtin, Sergei Dovlatov, Vladimir Gubin, and Vladimir Maramzin, he founded the Leningrad writers' group "Townspeople" (Gorozhane), whose works circulated in samizdat. He was also the founder of Hermitage Publishers; a company specializing in Russian writers.

== Biography ==
In 1960, he graduated from the Leningrad Polytechnic Institute. He then attended the Maxim Gorky Literature Institute; graduating in 1973. He joined the Union of Soviet Writers in 1965. He originally wrote stories for children and pieces for Soviet radio and television as well as screenplays. It was not known until after he left the Soviet Union, in 1978 by way of Austria, that he had written Practical Metaphysics and Metapolitics under the pseudonym Andrei Moscovit.

After arriving in the United States, he worked for Ardis Publishing until 1981, when he established his own company to print works, both contemporary and classic, that could not be published in the USSR. The writers who were first presented by Hermitage include Sergei Averintsev, Vasily Aksyonov, Fridrikh Gorenstein, Lev Losev, Anatoly Naiman, Ernst Neizvestny and Mark Popovsky.

Since 1991, most of his works have appeared in Russia. Many originally appeared in the literary journal Zvezda (Star). In 2005, he published The Noble Prankster, a memoir of Joseph Brodsky. This was followed by a new work of philosophy, The Shameful Mystery of Inequality. Five of his works are available in English and a book on the Assassination of President Kennedy was published in France.

All the critics who have written about Yefimov have noted the philosophical nature of his prose; Brodsky described him as belonging "to the great Russian tradition of philosophical writers in the vein of Herzen." However, his books also have another characteristic, noted by Yakov Gordin in his foreword to the Russian edition of the novel Arkhivy Strashnogo Suda (The Judgment Day Archives): "The real hero of Yefimov's prose has always been human passion. To put it in other words - will in arousal."

Born in Moscow in 1937, Yefimov died at home in Pennsylvania on August 12, 2020, aged 83.

== In translation ==
English

- Our Choice And History. New York: Philosophical Library, 1985. ("Метаполитика".)
- The Judgment Day Archives. San Francisco: Mercury House, 1988. ("Архивы Страшного суда".)
- The Seventh Wife. Dallas: Baskerville, 1994. ("Седьмая жена".)
- Did Castro Kill Kennedy? Miami, 1997. ("Кеннеди, Освальд, Кастро, Хрущёв".)
- Five Talents or One? The Shocking Secret of Inequality. Tenafly: Hermitage Publishers, 2004. ("Стыдная тайна неравенства")

French

- "Comment Castro a tué Kennedy." Éditions du Rocher, France, 2006. (Перевод «Кеннеди, Освальд, Кастро, Хрущёв»)

== See also ==
- List of American philosophers
