= Yurii Shirokov =

- Born: June 21, 1921
- Died: July 5, 1980 (aged 59)
- Education: Moscow State University (1948)
- Scientific career
- Fields: Nuclear Physics; Quantum Mechanics

Yurii Shirokov, (Широков, Юрий Михайлович 21.6.1921—5.7.1980) was a writer, physicist, and professor. He graduated from Moscow State University (Moscow) in 1948. He worked in the same university, then in the Steklov Mathematical Institute (Moscow). He wrote more than 100 scientific papers and several monographs, among which the textbook Nuclear Physics is particularly relevant. .

== Algebra of generalized functions ==
Yu.Shirokov had constructed the Algebra of Generalized functions. Then it was applied to various systems .

== Classical and quantum mechanics ==
Shirokov was, perhaps, not the first to mention that quantum mechanics has many classical limits. The Planck constant $~\hbar~$ appears in many relations, and there are many options to keep some of parameters (or even to vary them all) as $~\hbar \rightarrow 0~$. The most known limiting cases of quantum mechanics are classical waves and Newtonian mechanics. Shirokov has systematised the construction of classical limits of quantum mechanics, see .

== Development of Shirokov's ideas ==
The most important ideas about the quantum mechanics and the theoretical physics in general formulated by Shirokov are not yet developed. In particular, the field theory in terms of wave packets (i.e., without divergent terms and without divergent series) is not yet constructed.
