= New Uzbekistan University =

Uzbek state university in Tashkent

- Yangi O'zbekiston Universiteti
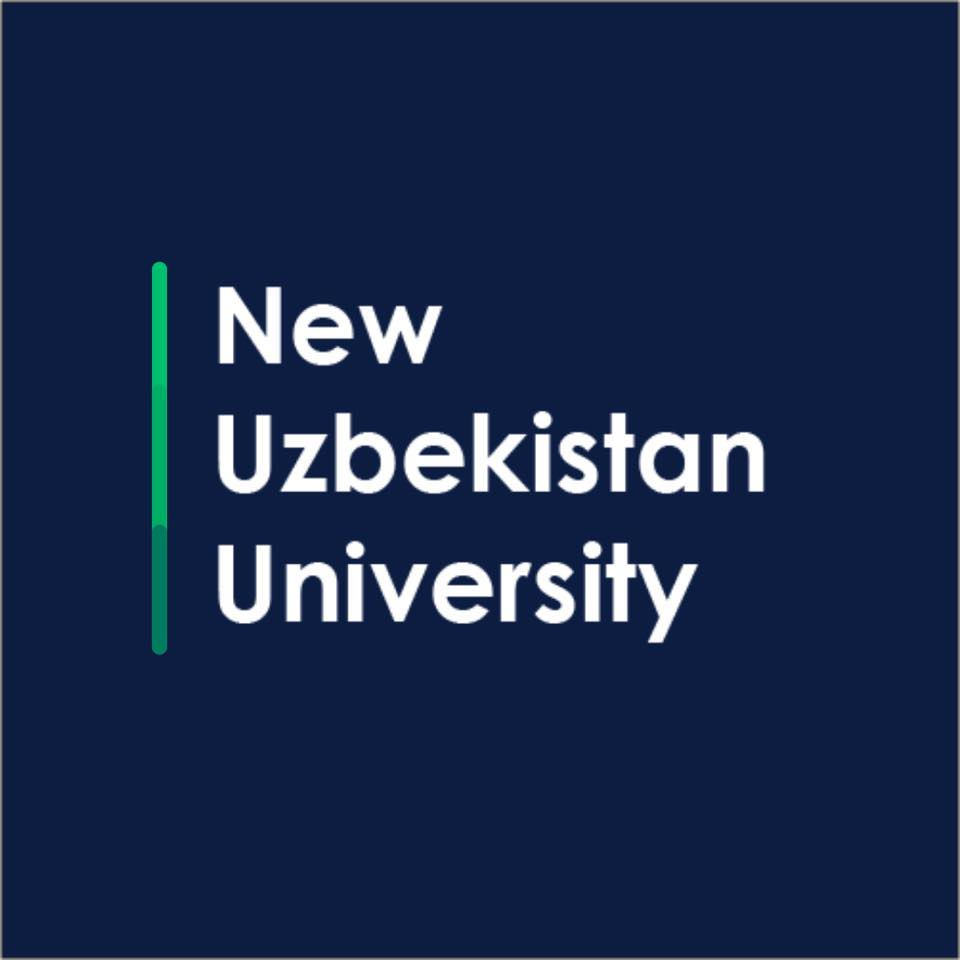
- Established: 2021
- President: Wolfgang A. Herrmann
- Rector: Obid Khakimov
- Students: 1000+
- Location: Tashkent city, Mirzo Ulugbek district, Movarounnahr street 1, Tashkent, 100007, Uzbekistan; 41°18′58.4″N 69°17′42.554″E
- Language: English
- Website: https://newuu.uz/

New Uzbekistan University (Uzbek: Yangi O'zbekiston universiteti) is an Uzbek state university in Uzbekistan's capital Tashkent. It was founded in 2021 by presidential decree as the first public autonomous university with the aim of taking a leading position in research and teaching. It is part of the presidential education system of Uzbekistan.

== History ==
The university was established by a decree of Uzbek President Shavkat Mirziyoyev. Shortly after the opening in summer 2021, the first high school graduates started an orientation year in order to bring all students to a uniform level of performance. Since all courses are taught in English, the curriculum also includes English language courses organized by Cambridge Assessment International Education. Adapted to the country's need for graduates in the engineering field, the first three bachelor's degree programs in mechanical engineering, chemical engineering and software engineering started in 2022.

Wolfgang A. Herrmann, former president (from 1995 to 2019) of Technical University of Munich (TUM), is the honorary president of New Uzbekistan University since July 2021.

The development of the university is supported by TUM International, a 100% subsidiary of the Technical University of Munich, and the Jameel World Education Lab (J-WEL) of Massachusetts Institute of Technology (MIT).

In 2023 and 2024, New Uzbekistan University has established partnerships and cooperations with Nazarbayev University from Kazakhstan and different German universities in Saxony and Bavaria.

New Uzbekistan University and Hochschule Mittweida university of applied sciences offer a double-degree in industrial management (M. Sc.).

=== Recent developments ===
New Uzbekistan University's main building (Ulugbek Central Auditorium (UCA))

In April 2024, the president of Uzbekistan initiated the construction of first facilities in New Tashkent, including the campus of New Uzbekistan University.

In Fall 2024, the university has launched a master's degree program in "Modern Physics".

On 16 October 2024, the Times Higher Education Central Asia Universities Forum took place at New Uzbekistan University.

== Schools and Department ==
The university is organized into five different schools with different departments:

- School of Engineering
  - Department of Mechanical Engineering
  - Department of Chemical & Material Science Engineering
  - Department of Physics
- School of Computing
  - Department of Software Engineering
  - Department of Artificial Intelligence and Robotics
  - Department of Cybersecurity
- School of Humanities, Social, and Natural Sciences
  - Department of Mathematics
  - Department of Economics
  - Department of Education
- School of Management
  - Department of Industrial Management
- School for Academic Excellence
  - Department of English
  - Department of General Education
