= Quarter period =

Special function in the theory of elliptic functions

In mathematics, the quarter periods K(m) and iK ′(m) are special functions that appear in the theory of elliptic functions.

The quarter periods K and iK ′ are given by

$$K(m)=\int_0^{\frac{\pi}{2}} \frac{d\theta}{\sqrt {1-m \sin^2 \theta}}$$

and

$${\rm{i}}K'(m) = {\rm{i}}K(1-m).\,$$

When m is a real number, 0 < m < 1, then both K and K ′ are real numbers. By convention, K is called the real quarter period and iK ′ is called the imaginary quarter period. Any one of the numbers m, K, K ′, or K ′/K uniquely determines the others.

These functions appear in the theory of Jacobian elliptic functions; they are called quarter periods because the elliptic functions $\operatorname{sn}u$ and $\operatorname{cn}u$ are periodic functions with periods $4K$ and $4{\rm{i}}K'.$ However, the $\operatorname{sn}$ function is also periodic with a smaller period (in terms of the absolute value) than $4\mathrm iK'$, namely $2\mathrm iK'$.

== Notation ==
The quarter periods are essentially the elliptic integral of the first kind, by making the substitution $k^2=m$. In this case, one writes $K(k)\,$ instead of $K(m)$, understanding the difference between the two depends notationally on whether $k$ or $m$ is used. This notational difference has spawned a terminology to go with it:

- $m$ is called the parameter
- $m_1= 1-m$ is called the complementary parameter
- $k$ is called the elliptic modulus
- $k'$ is called the complementary elliptic modulus, where ${k'}^2=m_1$
- $\alpha$ the modular angle, where $k=\sin \alpha,$
- $\frac{\pi}{2}-\alpha$ the complementary modular angle. Note that

$$m_1=\sin^2\left(\frac{\pi}{2}-\alpha\right)=\cos^2 \alpha.$$

The elliptic modulus can be expressed in terms of the quarter periods as

$$k=\operatorname{ns} (K+{\rm{i}}K')$$

and

$$k'= \operatorname{dn} K$$

where $\operatorname{ns}$ and $\operatorname{dn}$ are Jacobian elliptic functions.

The nome $q\,$ is given by

$$q=e^{-\frac{\pi K'}{K}}.$$

The complementary nome is given by

$$q_1=e^{-\frac{\pi K}{K'}}.$$

The real quarter period can be expressed as a Lambert series involving the nome:

$$K=\frac{\pi}{2} + 2\pi\sum_{n=1}^\infty \frac{q^n}{1+q^{2n}}.$$

Additional expansions and relations can be found on the page for elliptic integrals.
