= Neville theta functions =

In mathematics, the Neville theta functions, named after Eric Harold Neville, are defined as follows:

$$\theta_c(z,m)=\frac {\sqrt{2\pi}\,q(m)^{1/4}}{m^{1/4}\sqrt {K(m)}}\,\, \sum _{k=0}^\infty (q(m))^{k(k+1)} \cos \left(\frac{( 2k+1) \pi z}{2 K(m)} \right)$$

$$\theta_d(z,m)=\frac{\sqrt{2\pi}}{2\sqrt{K(m)}}\,\,\left( 1+2\,\sum _{k=1}^\infty (q(m))^{k^2} \cos \left( \frac {\pi zk}{K(m)} \right) \right)$$

$$\theta_n(z, m) =\frac {\sqrt {2\pi }}{2(1-m)^{1/4}\sqrt {K(m)}}\,\,\left( 1+2\sum _{k=1}^\infty (-1)^k (q(m))^{k^2} \cos \left(\frac{\pi zk}{K(m)} \right) \right)$$

$$\theta_s(z, m)=\frac{\sqrt {2\pi}\,q(m)^{1/4}}{m^{1/4}(1-m)^{1/4}\sqrt{K(m)}}\,\, \sum_{k=0}^\infty (-1)^k (q(m))^{k(k+1) } \sin\left(\frac { (2k+1) \pi z}{2K(m)} \right)$$

where: K(m) is the complete elliptic integral of the first kind, $K'(m)=K(1-m)$, and $q(m) = e^{-\pi K'(m)/K(m)}$ is the elliptic nome.

Note that the functions θ_{p}(z,m) are sometimes defined in terms of the nome q(m) and written θ_{p}(z,q) (e.g. NIST). The functions may also be written in terms of the τ parameter θ_{p}(z|τ) where $q=e^{i\pi\tau}$.

== Relationship to other functions ==
The Neville theta functions may be expressed in terms of the Jacobi theta functions

$$\theta_s(z|\tau)=\theta_3^2(0|\tau)\theta_1(z'|\tau)/\theta'_1(0|\tau)$$
$$\theta_c(z|\tau)=\theta_2(z'|\tau)/\theta_2(0|\tau)$$
$$\theta_n(z|\tau)=\theta_4(z'|\tau)/\theta_4(0|\tau)$$
$$\theta_d(z|\tau)=\theta_3(z'|\tau)/\theta_3(0|\tau)$$

where $z'=z/\theta_3^2(0|\tau)$.

The Neville theta functions are related to the Jacobi elliptic functions. If pq(u,m) is a Jacobi elliptic function (p and q are one of s,c,n,d), then

$$\operatorname{pq}(u,m)=\frac{\theta_p(u,m)}{\theta_q(u,m)}.$$

== Examples ==
- $\theta_c(2.5, 0.3)\approx -0.65900466676738154967$
- $\theta_d(2.5, 0.3)\approx 0.95182196661267561994$
- $\theta_n(2.5, 0.3)\approx 1.0526693354651613637$
- $\theta_s(2.5, 0.3)\approx 0.82086879524530400536$

== Symmetry ==
- $\theta_c(z,m)=\theta_c(-z,m)$
- $\theta_d(z,m)=\theta_d(-z,m)$
- $\theta_n(z,m)=\theta_n(-z,m)$
- $\theta_s(z,m)=-\theta_s(-z,m)$

== Complex 3D plots ==
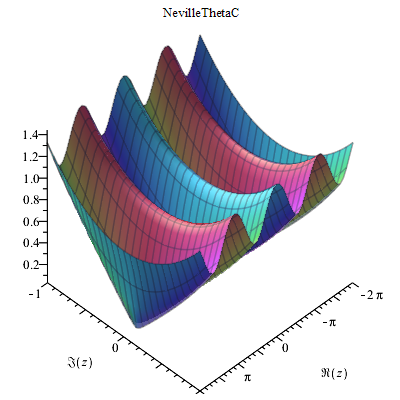

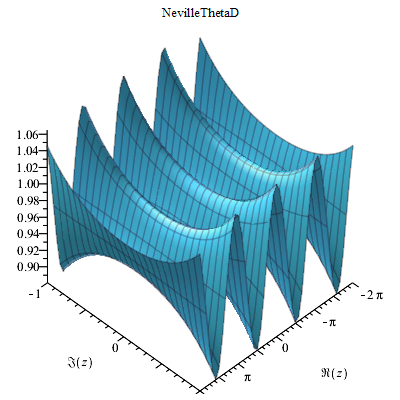

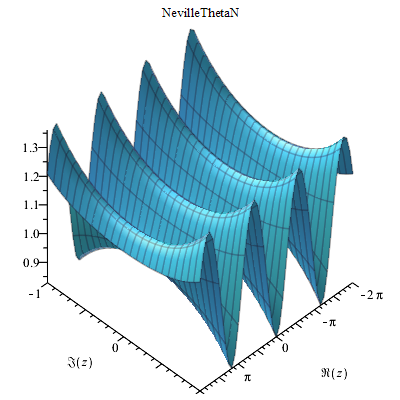

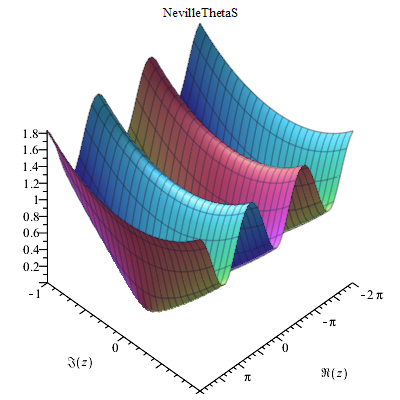
