= Legendre form =

Canonical set of three elliptic integrals

In mathematics, the Legendre forms of elliptic integrals are a canonical set of three elliptic integrals to which all others may be reduced. Legendre chose the name elliptic integrals because the second kind gives the arc length of an ellipse of unit semi-major axis and eccentricity $k$ (the ellipse being defined parametrically by $x = \sqrt{1 - k^{2}} \cos(t)$, $y = \sin(t)$).

In modern times the Legendre forms have largely been supplanted by an alternative canonical set, the Carlson symmetric forms. A more detailed treatment of the Legendre forms is given in the main article on elliptic integrals.

== Definition ==
The incomplete elliptic integral of the first kind is defined as

$$F(\phi,k) = \int_0^\phi \frac{1}{\sqrt{1 - k^2 \sin^2(t)}} dt,$$

the second kind as

$$E(\phi,k) = \int_0^\phi \sqrt{1 - k^2 \sin^2(t)}\,dt,$$

and the third kind as

$$\Pi(\phi,n,k) = \int_0^\phi \frac{1}{\big(1 - n \sin^2(t)\big)\sqrt{1 - k^2 \sin^2(t)}}\,dt.$$

The argument n of the third kind of integral is known as the characteristic, which in different notational conventions can appear as either the first, second or third argument of Π and furthermore is sometimes defined with the opposite sign. The argument order shown above is that of Gradshteyn and Ryzhik as well as Numerical Recipes. The choice of sign is that of Abramowitz and Stegun as well as Gradshteyn and Ryzhik, but corresponds to the $\Pi(\phi, -n, k)$ of Numerical Recipes.

The respective complete elliptic integrals are obtained by setting the amplitude, $\phi$, the upper limit of the integrals, to $\pi/2$.

The Legendre form of an elliptic curve is given by

$$y^2 = x(x - 1)(x - \lambda).$$

== Numerical evaluation ==
The classic method of evaluation is by means of Landen's transformations. Descending Landen transformation decreases the modulus $k$ towards zero, while increasing the amplitude $\phi$. Conversely, ascending transformation increases the modulus towards unity, while decreasing the amplitude. In either limit of $k$ approaching zero or one, the integral is readily evaluated.

Most modern authors recommend evaluation in terms of the Carlson symmetric forms, for which there exist efficient, robust and relatively simple algorithms. This approach has been adopted by Boost C++ Libraries, GNU Scientific Library and Numerical Recipes.

== See also ==
- Carlson symmetric form
