= John Landen =

English mathematician (1719–1790)

John Landen (23 January 1719 – 15 January 1790) was an English mathematician.

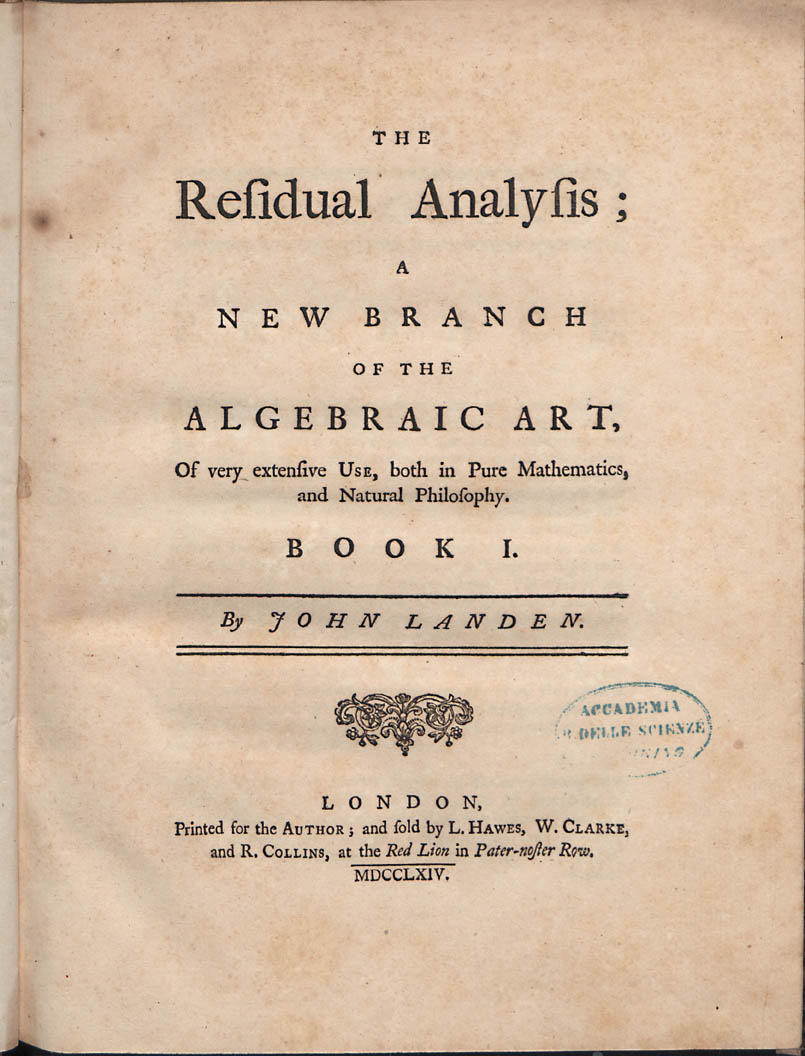
The residual analysis, 1764

== Life ==
He was born at Peakirk, near Peterborough in Northamptonshire, on 28 January 1719. He was brought up to the business of a surveyor, and acted as land agent to Earl Fitzwilliam, from 1762 to 1788.

Cultivating mathematics during his leisure hours, he became a contributor to the Ladies' Diary in 1744, published Mathematical Lucubrations in 1755, and from 1754 onwards communicated to the Royal Society valuable investigations on points connected with the fluxionary calculus. His attempt to substitute for it a purely algebraic method, expounded in book i. of Residual Analysis was further prosecuted by Lagrange. Book ii. never appeared.

Landen's transformation, for expressing a hyperbolic arc in terms of two elliptic arcs, was inserted in the Philosophical Transactions for 1775, and specimens of its use were given in the first volume of his ‘Mathematical Memoirs (1780). In a paper on rotary motion laid before the Royal Society on 17 March 1785 he obtained results differing from those of Euler and D'Alembert, and defending them in the second volume of Mathematical Memoirs prepared for the press during the intervals of a painful disease, and placed in his hands, printed, the day before his death at Milton, near Peterborough, the seat of the Earl Fitzwilliam on 15 January 1790. In the same work he solved the problem of the spinning of a top, and explained Newton's error in calculating the effects of precession.

Landen was elected a fellow of the Royal Society on 16 January 1766, and was a member of the Spalding Society. Though foreigners gave him a high rank among English analysts, he failed to develop and combine his discoveries. He led a retired life, chiefly at Walton in Northamptonshire.

== Works ==
- The Ladies' Diary, various communications (1744-1760)
- Papers in the Phil. Trans. (1754, 1760, 1768, 1771, 1775, 1777, 1785)
- Mathematical Lucubrations (1755)
- A Discourse concerning the Residual Analysis (1758)
- The Residual Analysis, book i. (1764)
- Animadversions on Dr Stewarts Method of computing the Sun's Distance from the Earth (1771)
- Mathematical Memoirs (1780, 1789)
