= Carlson symmetric form =

Set of elliptic integrals

In mathematics, the Carlson symmetric forms of elliptic integrals are a small canonical set of elliptic integrals to which all others may be reduced. They are a modern alternative to the Legendre forms. The Legendre forms may be expressed in terms of the Carlson forms and vice versa.

The Carlson elliptic integrals are:
$$R_F(x,y,z) = \tfrac{1}{2}\int_0^\infty \frac{dt}{\sqrt{(t+x)(t+y)(t+z)}}$$
$$R_J(x,y,z,p) = \tfrac{3}{2}\int_0^\infty \frac{dt}{(t+p)\sqrt{(t+x)(t+y)(t+z)}}$$
$$R_G(x,y,z) = \tfrac{1}{4}\int_0^\infty\frac{1}{\sqrt{(t+x)(t+y)(t+z)}}
\biggl(\frac{x}{t+x} + \frac{y}{t+y} + \frac{z}{t+z} \biggr) t\,dt$$
$$R_C(x,y) = R_F(x,y,y) = \tfrac{1}{2} \int_0^\infty \frac{dt}{(t+y)\sqrt{(t+x)}}$$
$$R_D(x,y,z) = R_J(x,y,z,z) = \tfrac{3}{2} \int_0^\infty \frac{dt}{ (t+z) \,\sqrt{(t+x)(t+y)(t+z)}}$$

Since $R_C$ and $R_D$ are special cases of $R_F$ and $R_J$, all elliptic integrals can ultimately be evaluated in terms of just $R_F$, $R_J$, and $R_G$.

The term symmetric refers to the fact that in contrast to the Legendre forms, these functions are unchanged by the exchange of certain subsets of their arguments. The value of $R_F(x,y,z)$ is the same for any permutation of its arguments, and the value of $R_J(x,y,z,p)$ is the same for any permutation of its first three arguments.

The Carlson elliptic integrals are named after Bille C. Carlson (1924–2013).

== Relation to the Legendre forms ==
=== Incomplete elliptic integrals ===
Incomplete elliptic integrals can be calculated easily using Carlson symmetric forms:

$$\begin{align}
F(\phi,k)&=\sin\phi R_F\left(\cos^2\phi,1-k^2\sin^2\phi,1\right), \\[5mu]
E(\phi,k)&=\sin\phi R_F\left(\cos^2\phi,1-k^2\sin^2\phi,1\right) - \tfrac{1}{3}k^2\sin^3\phi R_D\left(\cos^2\phi,1-k^2\sin^2\phi,1\right), \\[5mu]
\Pi(\phi,n,k)&=\sin\phi R_F\left(\cos^2\phi,1-k^2\sin^2\phi,1\right)+
\tfrac{1}{3}n\sin^3\phi R_J\left(\cos^2\phi,1-k^2\sin^2\phi,1,1-n\sin^2\phi\right).
\end{align}$$

(Note: the above are only valid for $\textstyle -\tfrac\pi2\le\phi\le\frac\pi2$ and $0\le k^2\sin^2\phi\le1$)

=== Complete elliptic integrals ===
Complete elliptic integrals can be calculated by substituting $\phi=\tfrac{\pi}{2}$:

$$\begin{align}
K(k) &= R_F\left(0,1-k^2,1\right), \\[5mu]
E(k) &= R_F\left(0,1-k^2,1\right)-\tfrac{1}{3}k^2 R_D\left(0,1-k^2,1\right), \\[5mu]
\Pi(n,k) &= R_F\left(0,1-k^2,1\right)+\tfrac{1}{3}n R_J \left(0,1-k^2,1,1-n\right)
\end{align}$$

== Special cases ==
When any two, or all three of the arguments of $R_F$ are the same, then a substitution of $\sqrt{t + x} = u$ renders the integrand rational. The integral can then be expressed in terms of elementary transcendental functions.

$$\begin{align} R_{C}(x,y)
&= R_{F}(x,y,y)
= \frac{1}{2} \int _{0}^{\infty} \frac{dt}{\sqrt{t + x} (t + y)}
= \int _{\sqrt{x}}^{\infty} \frac{du}{u^{2} - x + y} \\[5mu]
&=
\begin{cases}
\dfrac{\arccos \sqrt{{x}/{y}}}{\sqrt{y - x}},  & x < y \\[3mu]
\dfrac{1}{\sqrt{y}}, & x = y \\[3mu]
\dfrac{\operatorname{arcosh} \sqrt{{x}/{y}}}{\sqrt{x - y}},  & x > y
\end{cases}
\end{align}$$

Similarly, when at least two of the first three arguments of $R_J$ are the same,

$$\begin{align}
R_{J}(x,y,y,p)
&= 3 \int _{\sqrt{x}}^{\infty} \frac{du}{(u^{2} - x + y) (u^{2} - x + p)} \\[5mu]
&= \begin{cases}
\dfrac{3}{p - y} (R_{C}(x,y) - R_{C}(x,p)),  & y \ne p \\[3mu]
\dfrac{3}{2 (y - x)} \left( R_{C}(x,y) - \dfrac{1}{y} \sqrt{x}\right),  & y = p \ne x \\[3mu]
\dfrac{1}{y^{{3}/{2}}},  &y = p = x
\end{cases}
\end{align}$$

== Properties ==
=== Homogeneity ===
By substituting in the integral definitions $t = \kappa u$ for any constant $\kappa$, it is found that

$$\begin{align}
R_F\left(\kappa x,\kappa y,\kappa z\right) &= \kappa^{-1/2}R_F(x,y,z), \\[5mu]
R_J\left(\kappa x,\kappa y,\kappa z,\kappa p\right) &= \kappa^{-3/2}R_J(x,y,z,p).
\end{align}$$

=== Duplication theorem ===
$$R_F(x,y,z)=2R_F(x+\lambda,y+\lambda,z+\lambda)=
R_F\left(\frac{x+\lambda}{4},\frac{y+\lambda}{4},\frac{z+\lambda}{4}\right),$$

where $\lambda=\sqrt{\vphantom{ty} x}\sqrt{\vphantom{ty} y}+\sqrt{\vphantom{ty} y}\sqrt{\vphantom{ty} z}+\sqrt{\vphantom{ty} z}\sqrt{\vphantom{ty} x}$.

$$\begin{align}R_{J}(x,y,z,p) & = 2 R_{J}(x + \lambda,y + \lambda,z + \lambda,p + \lambda) + 6 R_{C}(d^{2},d^{2} + (p - x) (p - y) (p - z)) \\[5mu]
& = \frac{1}{4} R_{J}\left( \frac{x + \lambda}{4},\frac{y + \lambda}{4},\frac{z + \lambda}{4},\frac{p + \lambda}{4}\right) + 6 R_{C}(d^{2},d^{2} + (p - x) (p - y) (p - z)) \end{align}$$

where $d = \bigl(\sqrt{\vphantom{ty} p} + \sqrt{\vphantom{ty} x}\bigr) \bigl(\sqrt{\vphantom{ty} p} + \sqrt{\vphantom{ty} y}\bigr) \bigl(\sqrt{\vphantom{ty} p} + \sqrt{\vphantom{ty} z}\bigr)$ and $\lambda =\sqrt{\vphantom{ty} x}\sqrt{\vphantom{ty} y}+\sqrt{\vphantom{ty} y}\sqrt{\vphantom{ty} z}+\sqrt{\vphantom{ty} z}\sqrt{\vphantom{ty} x}$.

== Series Expansion ==
In obtaining a Taylor series expansion for $R_{F}$ or $R_{J}$ it proves convenient to expand about the mean value of the several arguments. So for $R_{F}$, letting the mean value of the arguments be $A = (x + y + z)/3$, and using homogeneity, define $\Delta x$, $\Delta y$ and $\Delta z$ by

$$\begin{align}R_{F}(x,y,z) & = R_{F}(A (1 - \Delta x),A (1 - \Delta y),A (1 - \Delta z)) \\
& = \frac{1}{\sqrt{A}} R_{F}(1 - \Delta x,1 - \Delta y,1 - \Delta z) \end{align}$$

that is $\Delta x = 1 - x/A$ etc. The differences $\Delta x$, $\Delta y$ and $\Delta z$ are defined with this sign (such that they are subtracted), in order to be in agreement with Carlson's papers. Since $R_{F}(x,y,z)$ is symmetric under permutation of $x$, $y$ and $z$, it is also symmetric in the quantities $\Delta x$, $\Delta y$ and $\Delta z$. It follows that both the integrand of $R_{F}$ and its integral can be expressed as functions of the elementary symmetric polynomials in $\Delta x$, $\Delta y$ and $\Delta z$ which are

$$E_{1} = \Delta x + \Delta y + \Delta z = 0$$

$$E_{2} = \Delta x \Delta y + \Delta y \Delta z + \Delta z \Delta x$$

$$E_{3} = \Delta x \Delta y \Delta z$$

Expressing the integrand in terms of these polynomials, performing a multidimensional Taylor expansion and integrating term-by-term...

$$\begin{align}R_{F}(x,y,z) & = \frac{1}{2 \sqrt{A}} \int _{0}^{\infty}\frac{1}{\sqrt{(t + 1)^{3} - (t + 1)^{2} E_{1} + (t + 1) E_{2} - E_{3}}} dt \\
& = \frac{1}{2 \sqrt{A}} \int _{0}^{\infty}\left( \frac{1}{(t + 1)^{\frac{3}{2}}} - \frac{E_{2}}{2 (t + 1)^{\frac{7}{2}}} + \frac{E_{3}}{2 (t + 1)^{\frac{9}{2}}} + \frac{3 E_{2}^{2}}{8 (t + 1)^{\frac{11}{2}}} - \frac{3 E_{2} E_{3}}{4 (t + 1)^{\frac{13}{2}}} + O(E_{1}) + O(\Delta^{6})\right) dt \\
& = \frac{1}{\sqrt{A}} \left( 1 - \frac{1}{10} E_{2} + \frac{1}{14} E_{3} + \frac{1}{24} E_{2}^{2} - \frac{3}{44} E_{2} E_{3} + O(E_{1}) + O(\Delta^{6})\right) \end{align}$$

The advantage of expanding about the mean value of the arguments is now apparent; it reduces $E_{1}$ identically to zero, and so eliminates all terms involving $E_{1}$ - which otherwise would be the most numerous.

An ascending series for $R_{J}$ may be found in a similar way. There is a slight difficulty because $R_{J}$ is not fully symmetric; its dependence on its fourth argument, $p$, is different from its dependence on $x$, $y$ and $z$. This is overcome by treating $R_{J}$ as a fully symmetric function of five arguments, two of which happen to have the same value $p$. The mean value of the arguments is therefore taken to be

$$A = \frac{x + y + z + 2 p}{5}$$

and the differences $\Delta x$, $\Delta y$ $\Delta z$ and $\Delta p$ defined by

$$\begin{align}R_{J}(x,y,z,p) & = R_{J}(A (1 - \Delta x),A (1 - \Delta y),A (1 - \Delta z),A (1 - \Delta p)) \\
& = \frac{1}{A^{3/2}} R_{J}(1 - \Delta x,1 - \Delta y,1 - \Delta z,1 - \Delta p) \end{align}$$

The elementary symmetric polynomials in $\Delta x$, $\Delta y$, $\Delta z$, $\Delta p$ and (again) $\Delta p$ are in full

$$E_{1} = \Delta x + \Delta y + \Delta z + 2 \Delta p = 0$$

$$E_{2} = \Delta x \Delta y + \Delta y \Delta z + 2 \Delta z \Delta p + \Delta p^{2} + 2 \Delta p \Delta x + \Delta x \Delta z + 2 \Delta y \Delta p$$

$$E_{3} = \Delta z \Delta p^{2} + \Delta x \Delta p^{2} + 2 \Delta x \Delta y \Delta p + \Delta x \Delta y \Delta z + 2 \Delta y \Delta z \Delta p + \Delta y \Delta p^{2} + 2 \Delta x \Delta z \Delta p$$

$$E_{4} = \Delta y \Delta z \Delta p^{2} + \Delta x \Delta z \Delta p^{2} + \Delta x \Delta y \Delta p^{2} + 2 \Delta x \Delta y \Delta z \Delta p$$

$$E_{5} = \Delta x \Delta y \Delta z \Delta p^{2}$$

However, it is possible to simplify the formulae for $E_{2}$, $E_{3}$ and $E_{4}$ using the fact that $E_{1} = 0$. Expressing the integrand in terms of these polynomials, performing a multidimensional Taylor expansion and integrating term-by-term as before...

$$\begin{align}R_{J}(x,y,z,p) & = \frac{3}{2 A^{3/2}} \int _{0}^{\infty}\frac{1}{\sqrt{(t + 1)^{5} - (t + 1)^{4} E_{1} + (t + 1)^{3} E_{2} - (t + 1)^{2} E_{3} + (t + 1) E_{4} - E_{5}}} dt \\
& = \frac{3}{2 A^{3/2}} \int _{0}^{\infty}\left( \frac{1}{(t + 1)^{\frac{5}{2}}} - \frac{E_{2}}{2 (t + 1)^{\frac{9}{2}}} + \frac{E_{3}}{2 (t + 1)^{\frac{11}{2}}} + \frac{3 E_{2}^{2} - 4 E_{4}}{8 (t + 1)^{\frac{13}{2}}} + \frac{2 E_{5} - 3 E_{2} E_{3}}{4 (t + 1)^{\frac{15}{2}}} + O(E_{1}) + O(\Delta^{6})\right) dt \\
& = \frac{1}{A^{3/2}} \left( 1 - \frac{3}{14} E_{2} + \frac{1}{6} E_{3} + \frac{9}{88} E_{2}^{2} - \frac{3}{22} E_{4} - \frac{9}{52} E_{2} E_{3} + \frac{3}{26} E_{5} + O(E_{1}) + O(\Delta^{6})\right) \end{align}$$

As with $R_{J}$, by expanding about the mean value of the arguments, more than half the terms (those involving $E_{1}$) are eliminated.

== Negative arguments ==
In general, the arguments x, y, z of Carlson's integrals may not be real and negative, as this would place a branch point on the path of integration, making the integral ambiguous. However, if the second argument of $R_C$, or the fourth argument, p, of $R_J$ is negative, then this results in a simple pole on the path of integration. In these cases the Cauchy principal value (finite part) of the integrals may be of interest; these are

$$\mathrm{p.v.}\; R_C(x, -y) = \sqrt{\frac{x}{x + y}}\,R_C(x + y, y),$$

and

$$\begin{align}\mathrm{p.v.}\; R_{J}(x,y,z,-p) & = \frac{(q - y) R_{J}(x,y,z,q) - 3 R_{F}(x,y,z) + 3 \sqrt{y\vphantom{t}} R_{C}(x z,- p q)}{y + p} \\
& = \frac{(q - y) R_{J}(x,y,z,q) - 3 R_{F}(x,y,z) + 3 \sqrt{\dfrac{x y z}{x z + p q}} R_{C}(x z + p q,p q)}{y + p} \end{align}$$

where

$$q = y + \frac{(z - y) (y - x)}{y + p}.$$

which must be greater than zero for $R_{J}(x,y,z,q)$ to be evaluated. This may be arranged by permuting x, y and z so that the value of y is between that of x and z.

== Numerical evaluation ==
The duplication theorem can be used for a fast and robust evaluation of the Carlson symmetric form of elliptic integrals and therefore also for the evaluation of Legendre-form of elliptic integrals. Let us calculate $R_F(x,y,z)$: first, define $x_0=x$, $y_0=y$ and $z_0=z$. Then iterate the series

$$\lambda_n=\sqrt{\vphantom{ty} x_n}\sqrt{\vphantom{ty} y_n}+\sqrt{\vphantom{ty} y_n}\sqrt{\vphantom{ty} z_n}+\sqrt{\vphantom{ty} z_n}\sqrt{\vphantom{ty} x_n},$$
$$x_{n+1}=\frac{x_n+\lambda_n}{4},\, y_{n+1}=\frac{y_n+\lambda_n}{4},\, z_{n+1}=\frac{z_n+\lambda_n}{4}$$

until the desired precision is reached: if $x$, $y$ and $z$ are non-negative, all of the series will converge quickly to a given value, say, $\mu$. Therefore,

$$R_F\left(x,y,z\right)=R_F\left(\mu,\mu,\mu\right)=\mu^{-1/2}.$$

Evaluating $R_C(x,y)$ is much the same due to the relation

$$R_C\left(x,y\right)=R_F\left(x,y,y\right).$$

== References and External links ==
- Carlson, B. C. (1965). "On computing elliptic integrals and functions". J. Math. Phys. 33 (1–4): 36–61. doi:10.1002/apm196544136.
- Carlson, B.C. (1979). "Computing elliptic integrals by duplication". Numer. Math. 33: 1–16. doi:10.1007/BF01396491.
- Carlson, B. C.; Notis, Elaine M. (1981). "Algorithm 577 Algorithms for incomplete elliptic integrals". ACM Trans. Math. Soft. 7 (3): 398–403. doi:10.1145/355958.355970.
- Carlson, B. C. (1992). "A table of elliptic integrals:two quadratic factors". Math. Comp. 59 (199): 165–180. doi:10.1090/S0025-5718-1992-1134720-4.}
- Carlson, B. C.; Gustafson, John L. (1993). "Asymptotic approximations for symmetric elliptic integrals". arXiv:math/9310223.
- Carlson, B. C. (1994). "Numerical Computation of Real Or Complex Elliptic Integrals". arXiv:math/9409227.
- Carlson, B. C. (2010), "Elliptic Integrals:Symmetric Integrals", in Olver, Frank W. J.; Lozier, Daniel M.; Boisvert, Ronald F.; Clark, Charles W. (eds.), NIST Handbook of Mathematical Functions, Cambridge University Press, ISBN 978-0-521-19225-5, MR 2723248.
- Olver, Frank W. J.; Lozier, Daniel M.; Boisvert, Ronald F.; Clark, Charles W., eds. (2010), "Profile: Bille C. Carlson", NIST Handbook of Mathematical Functions, Cambridge University Press, ISBN 978-0-521-19225-5, MR 2723248.
- Press, WH; Teukolsky, SA; Vetterling, WT; Flannery, BP (2007), "Section 6.12. Elliptic Integrals and Jacobian Elliptic Functions", Numerical Recipes: The Art of Scientific Computing (3rd ed.), New York: Cambridge University Press, ISBN 978-0-521-88068-8, archived from the original on 2011-08-11
- Fortran code from SLATEC for evaluating RF, RJ, RC, RD,
- Python numpy library code
- C/C++ FLINT library
