= Angular eccentricity =

Angular eccentricity α (alpha) and linear eccentricity (ε). Note that OA=BF=a.

Angular eccentricity is one of many parameters which arise in the study of the ellipse or ellipsoid. It is denoted here by α (alpha). It may be defined in terms of the eccentricity, e, or the aspect ratio, b/a (the ratio of the semi-minor axis and the semi-major axis):

$$\alpha=\sin^{-1}\!e=\cos^{-1}\left(\frac{b}{a}\right).
\,\!$$

Angular eccentricity is not currently used in English language publications on mathematics, geodesy or map projections but it does appear in older literature.

Any non-dimensional parameter of the ellipse may be expressed in terms of the angular eccentricity. Such expressions are listed in the following table after the conventional definitions. in terms of the semi-axes. The notation for these parameters varies. Here we follow Rapp:

(first) eccentricity	$e$	$\frac{\sqrt{a^2-b^2}}{a}$	$\sin\alpha$	
second eccentricity	$e'$	$\frac{\sqrt{a^2-b^2}}{b}$	$\tan\alpha$	
third eccentricity	$e''$	$\sqrt{\frac{a^2-b^2}{a^2+b^2}}$	$\frac{\sin\alpha}{\sqrt{2-\sin^2\alpha}}$	
(first) flattening	$f$	$\frac{a-b}{a}$	$1-\cos\alpha$	$=2\sin^2\left(\frac{\alpha}{2}\right)$
second flattening	$f'$	$\frac{a-b}{b}$	$\sec\alpha-1$	$=\frac{2\sin^2(\frac{\alpha}{2})}{1-2\sin^2(\frac{\alpha}{2})}$
third flattening	$n$	$\frac{a-b}{a+b}$	$\frac{1-\cos\alpha}{1+\cos\alpha}$	$= \tan^2\left(\frac{\alpha}{2}\right)$

The alternative expressions for the flattenings would guard against large cancellations in numerical work.
