= Dixon elliptic functions =

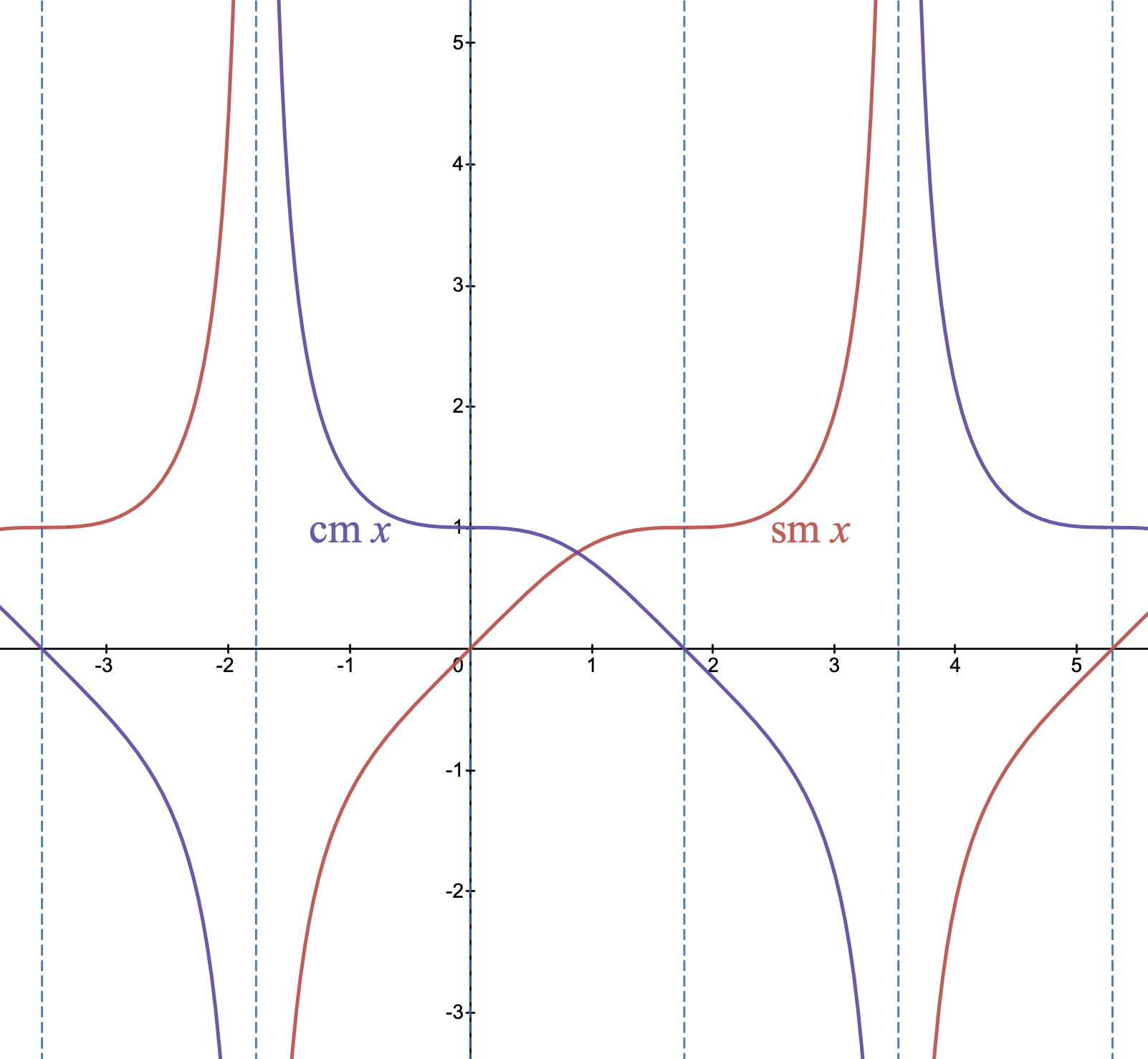
The Dixon elliptic functions cm, sm applied to a real-valued argument x. Both functions are periodic with real period π_{3} ≈ 5.29991625

In mathematics, the Dixon elliptic functions sm and cm are two elliptic functions (doubly periodic meromorphic functions on the complex plane) that map from each regular hexagon in a hexagonal tiling to the whole complex plane. Because these functions satisfy the identity $\operatorname{cm}^3 z + \operatorname{sm}^3 z = 1$, as real functions they parametrize the cubic Fermat curve $x^3 + y^3 = 1$, just as the trigonometric functions sine and cosine parametrize the unit circle $x^2 + y^2 = 1$.

They were named sm and cm by Alfred Dixon in 1890, by analogy to the trigonometric functions sine and cosine and the Jacobi elliptic functions sn and cn; Göran Dillner described them earlier in 1873.

== Definition ==
The functions sm and cm can be defined as the solutions to the initial value problem:
$$\frac{d}{dz} \operatorname{cm} z = -\operatorname{sm}^2 z,\ \frac{d}{dz} \operatorname{sm} z = \operatorname{cm}^2 z,\  \operatorname{cm}(0) = 1,\  \operatorname{sm}(0) = 0$$

Or as the inverse of the Schwarz–Christoffel mapping from the complex unit disk to an equilateral triangle, the Abelian integral:
$$z = \int_0^{\operatorname{sm} z} \frac{dw}{(1 - w^3)^{2/3}} = \int_{\operatorname{cm} z}^1 \frac{dw}{(1 - w^3)^{2/3}}$$
which can also be expressed using the hypergeometric function:
$$\operatorname{sm}^{-1}(z) = z\; {}_2F_1\bigl(\tfrac13, \tfrac23; \tfrac43; z^3\bigr)$$

== Parametrization of the cubic Fermat curve ==
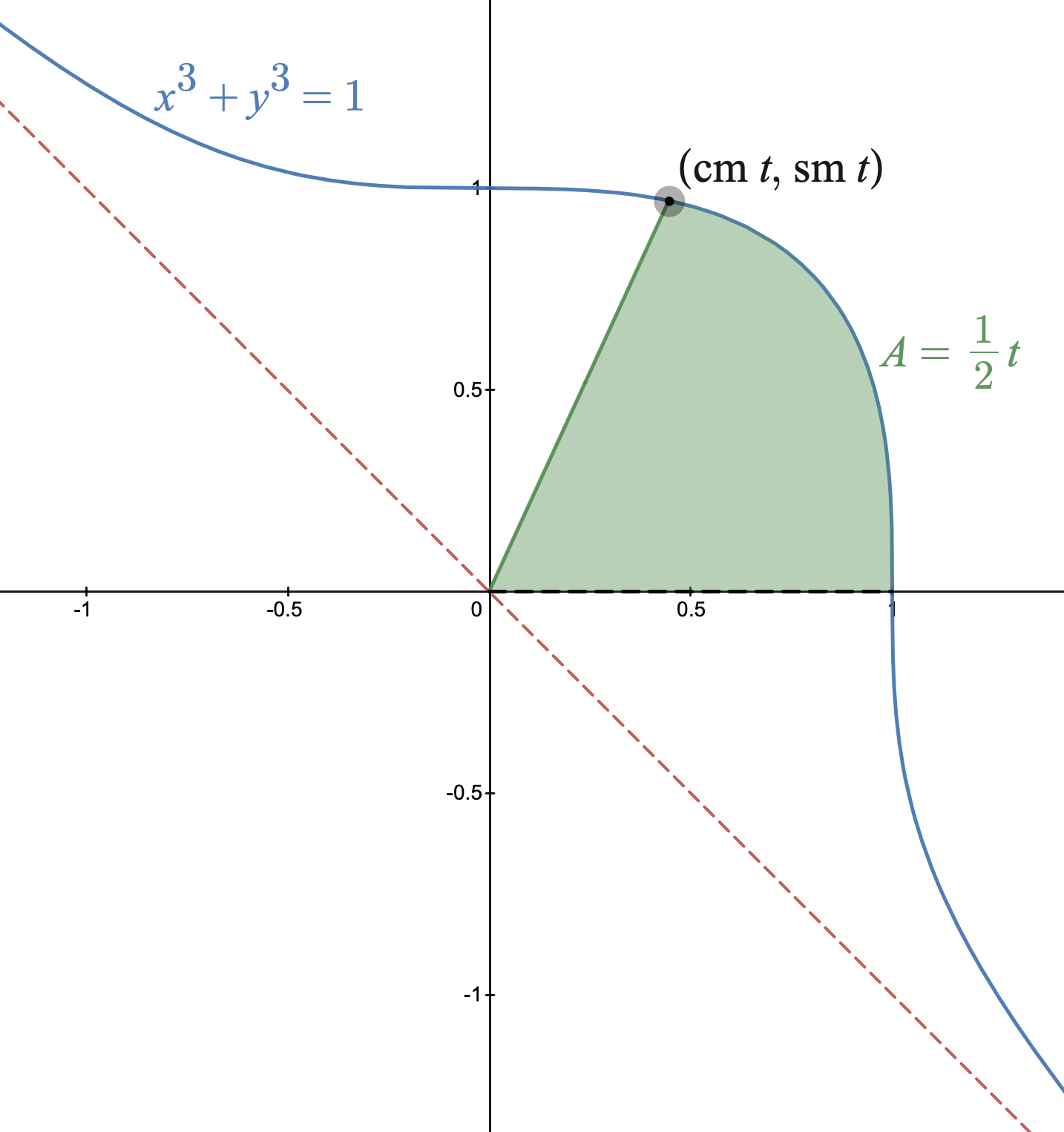
The function t ↦ (cm t, sm t) parametrizes the cubic Fermat curve, with area of the sector equal to half the argument t.

Both sm and cm have a period along the real axis of $\pi_3 = {}$$\Beta\bigl( \tfrac13, \tfrac13\bigr) = {}$$\tfrac{\sqrt{3}}{2\pi}\Gamma^3\bigl(\tfrac{1}{3}\bigr)\approx {}$$5.29991625$ with $\Beta$ the beta function and $\Gamma$ the gamma function:
$$\begin{aligned} \tfrac13\pi_3 &= \int_{-\infty}^0 \frac{dx}{(1 - x^3)^{2/3}} = \int_0^1 \frac{dx}{(1 - x^3)^{2/3}} = \int_1^\infty \frac{dx}{(1 - x^3)^{2/3}} \\[8mu] &\approx 1.76663875 \end{aligned}$$

They satisfy the identity $\operatorname{cm}^3 z + \operatorname{sm}^3 z = 1$. The parametric function $t \mapsto (\operatorname{cm} t,\, \operatorname{sm} t),$ $t \in \bigl[{-\tfrac13}\pi_3, \tfrac23\pi_3\bigr]$ parametrizes the cubic Fermat curve $x^3 + y^3 = 1,$ with $\tfrac12 t$ representing the signed area lying between the segment from the origin to $(1,\, 0)$, the segment from the origin to $(\operatorname{cm} t,\, \operatorname{sm} t)$, and the Fermat curve, analogous to the relationship between the argument of the trigonometric functions and the area of a sector of the unit circle. To see why, apply Green's theorem:
$$A = \tfrac 12 \int_0^t (x\mathop{dy} -y\mathop{dx}) = \tfrac 12 \int_0^t (\operatorname{cm}^3 t + \operatorname{sm}^3 t)\mathop{dt} = \tfrac 12 \int_0^t dt = \tfrac12 t.$$

Notice that the area between the $x + y = 0$ and $x^3 + y^3 = 1$ can be broken into three pieces, each of area $\tfrac16\pi_3$:
$$\begin{aligned}
\tfrac12\pi_3 &= \int_{-\infty}^\infty \bigl((1 - x^3)^{1/3} + x\bigr)\mathop{dx} \\[8mu]
\tfrac16\pi_3 &= \int_{-\infty}^0 \bigl((1 - x^3)^{1/3} + x\bigr)\mathop{dx} = \int_0^1 (1 - x^3)^{1/3} \mathop{dx}.
\end{aligned}$$

== Symmetries ==
The Dixon elliptic function sm z in the complex plane, illustrating its double periodicity (ω = e^{2πi/3}).

The function $\operatorname{sm} z$ has zeros at the complex-valued points $z = \tfrac1\sqrt{3}\pi_3i(a + b\omega)$ for any integers $a$ and $b$, where $\omega$ is a cube root of unity, $\omega = \exp \tfrac23 i \pi = -\tfrac12 + \tfrac\sqrt{3}2i$ (that is, $a + b\omega$ is an Eisenstein integer). The function $\operatorname{cm} z$ has zeros at the complex-valued points $z = \tfrac13\pi_3 + \tfrac1\sqrt{3}\pi_3i(a + b\omega)$. Both functions have poles at the complex-valued points $z = -\tfrac13\pi_3 + \tfrac1\sqrt{3}\pi_3i(a + b\omega)$.

On the real line, $\operatorname{sm}x=0\leftrightarrow x\in\pi_3\mathbb{Z}$, which is analogous to $\sin x=0\leftrightarrow x\in\pi\mathbb{Z}$.

=== Fundamental reflections, rotations, and translations ===
Both cm and sm commute with complex conjugation,
$$\begin{align}
\operatorname{cm} \bar{z} &= \overline{\operatorname{cm} z}, \\
\operatorname{sm} \bar{z} &= \overline{\operatorname{sm} z}.
\end{align}$$

Analogous to the parity of trigonometric functions (cosine an even function and sine an odd function), the Dixon function cm is invariant under $\tfrac13$ turn rotations of the complex plane, and $\tfrac13$ turn rotations of the domain of sm cause $\tfrac13$ turn rotations of the codomain:
$$\begin{align}
\operatorname{cm} \omega z &= \operatorname{cm} z = \operatorname{cm} \omega^2 z, \\
\operatorname{sm} \omega z &= \omega \operatorname{sm} z = \omega^2 \operatorname{sm} \omega^2 z.
\end{align}$$

Each Dixon elliptic function is invariant under translations by the Eisenstein integers $a + b\omega$ scaled by $\pi_3,$
$$\begin{align}
\operatorname{cm}\bigl(z + \pi_3(a + b\omega)\bigr) = \operatorname{cm} z, \\
\operatorname{sm}\bigl(z + \pi_3(a + b\omega)\bigr) = \operatorname{sm} z.
\end{align}$$

Negation of each of cm and sm is equivalent to a $\tfrac13\pi_3$ translation of the other,
$$\begin{align}
\operatorname{cm}(-z) &= \frac{1}{\operatorname{cm} z} = \operatorname{sm} \bigl(z + \tfrac13\pi_3\bigr), \\
\operatorname{sm}(-z) &= -\frac{\operatorname{sm} z}{\operatorname{cm} z} = \frac{1}{\operatorname{sm} \bigl(z - \tfrac13\pi_3\bigr)} =  \operatorname{cm} \bigl(z + \tfrac13\pi_3\bigr).
\end{align}$$

For $n \in \mathbb \{0, 1, 2\},$ translations by $\tfrac13\pi_3\omega$ give
$$\begin{align}
\operatorname{cm}\bigl(z+\tfrac13\omega^n\pi_3\bigr) &= \omega^{2n}\frac{-\operatorname{sm} z}{\operatorname{cm} z}, \\
\operatorname{sm}\bigl(z+\tfrac13\omega^n\pi_3\bigr) &= \omega^n\frac{1}{\operatorname{cm} z}.
\end{align}$$

=== Specific values ===
$z$	$\operatorname{cm} z$	$\operatorname{sm} z$
${-\tfrac13}\pi_3$	$\infty$	$\infty$
${-\tfrac16}\pi_3$	$\sqrt[3]{2}$	$-1$
$0$	$1$	$0$
${\tfrac16}\pi_3$	$1\big/\sqrt[3]{2}$	$1\big/\sqrt[3]{2}$
${\tfrac13}\pi_3$	$0$	$1$
${\tfrac12}\pi_3$	$-1$	$\sqrt[3]{2}$
${\tfrac23}\pi_3$	$\infty$	$\infty$

==== More specific values ====
$z$	$\operatorname{cm} z$	$\operatorname{sm} z$
${-\tfrac14}\pi_3$	$\frac {1 + \sqrt{3} + \sqrt{2\sqrt{3}}} {2}$	$\frac { -1 - \sqrt{3 + 2\sqrt{3}}} { \sqrt[3]{4}}$
$-{\tfrac29}\pi_3$	$\frac{\sqrt[6]3}{2\sin\left(\frac19\pi\right)}$	$-\frac{2\cos\left(\frac1{18}\pi\right)}{\sqrt[6]3}$
$-{\tfrac19}\pi_3$	$\frac{2\sin\left(\frac29\pi\right)}{\sqrt[6]3}$	$-\frac{\sqrt[6]3}{2\cos\left(\frac1{18}\pi\right)}$
$-{\tfrac{1}{12}}\pi_3$	$\frac { -1 + \sqrt{3} + \sqrt{2\sqrt{3}}} {2\sqrt[3]{2}}$	$\frac { -1 + \sqrt{3} - \sqrt{2\sqrt{3}}} {2\sqrt[3]{2}}$
${\tfrac{1}{12}}\pi_3$	$\frac { -1 + \sqrt{3 + 2\sqrt{3}}} { \sqrt[3]{4}}$	$\frac {1 + \sqrt{3} - \sqrt{2\sqrt{3}}} {2}$
${\tfrac19}\pi_3$	$\frac{\sqrt[6]3}{2\sin\left(\frac29\pi\right)}$	$\frac{2\sin\left(\frac19\pi\right)}{\sqrt[6]3}$
${\tfrac29}\pi_3$	$\frac{2\sin\left(\frac19\pi\right)}{\sqrt[6]3}$	$\frac{\sqrt[6]3}{2\sin\left(\frac29\pi\right)}$
${\tfrac14}\pi_3$	$\frac {1 + \sqrt{3} - \sqrt{2\sqrt{3}}} {2}$	$\frac { -1 + \sqrt{3 + 2\sqrt{3}}} { \sqrt[3]{4}}$
${\tfrac{5}{12}}\pi_3$	$\frac { -1 + \sqrt{3} - \sqrt{2\sqrt{3}}} {2\sqrt[3]{2}}$	$\frac { -1 + \sqrt{3} + \sqrt{2\sqrt{3}}} {2\sqrt[3]{2}}$
${\tfrac49}\pi_3$	$-\frac{\sqrt[6]3}{2\cos\left(\frac1{18}\pi\right)}$	$\frac{2\sin\left(\frac29\pi\right)}{\sqrt[6]3}$
${\tfrac59}\pi_3$	$-\frac{2\cos\left(\frac1{18}\pi\right)}{\sqrt[6]3}$	$\frac{\sqrt[6]3}{2\sin\left(\frac19\pi\right)}$
${\tfrac{7}{12}}\pi_3$	$\frac { -1 - \sqrt{3 + 2\sqrt{3}}} { \sqrt[3]{4}}$	$\frac {1 + \sqrt{3} + \sqrt{2\sqrt{3}}} {2}$

== Sum and difference identities ==
The Dixon elliptic functions satisfy the argument sum and difference identities:
$$\begin{aligned}
\operatorname{cm}( u + v ) &= \frac
{ \operatorname{sm} u \,\operatorname{cm} u - \operatorname{sm} v \,\operatorname{cm} v }
{ \operatorname{sm} u \,\operatorname{cm}^2 v - \operatorname{cm}^2 u \,\operatorname{sm} v }
\\[8mu]
\operatorname{cm}( u - v ) &= \frac
{ \operatorname{cm}^2 u \,\operatorname{cm} v - \operatorname{sm} u \,\operatorname{sm}^2 v }
{ \operatorname{cm} u \,\operatorname{cm}^2 v - \operatorname{sm}^2 u \,\operatorname{sm} v }
\\[8mu]
\operatorname{sm}( u + v ) &= \frac
{ \operatorname{sm}^2 u \,\operatorname{cm} v - \operatorname{cm} u \,\operatorname{sm}^2 v }
{ \operatorname{sm} u \,\operatorname{cm}^2 v - \operatorname{cm}^2 u \,\operatorname{sm} v }
\\[8mu]
\operatorname{sm}( u - v ) &= \frac
{ \operatorname{sm} u \,\operatorname{cm} u - \operatorname{sm} v \,\operatorname{cm} v }
{ \operatorname{cm} u \,\operatorname{cm}^2 v - \operatorname{sm}^2 u \,\operatorname{sm} v }
\end{aligned}$$

These formulas can be used to compute the complex-valued functions in real components:
$$\begin{aligned}
\operatorname{cm}(x + \omega y)
&= \frac
{ \operatorname{sm} x \,\operatorname{cm} x - \omega\,\operatorname{sm} y \,\operatorname{cm} y }
{ \operatorname{sm} x \,\operatorname{cm}^2 y - \omega\,\operatorname{cm}^2 x \,\operatorname{sm} y }\\[4mu]
&= \frac{ \operatorname{cm} x (\operatorname{sm}^2 x \,\operatorname{cm}^2 y + \operatorname{cm} x \,\operatorname{sm}^2 y \,\operatorname{cm} y + \operatorname{sm} x \,\operatorname{cm}^2 x \,\operatorname{sm} y) }{\operatorname{sm}^2 x \,\operatorname{cm}^4 y + \operatorname{sm} x \,\operatorname{cm}^2 x \,\operatorname{sm} y \,\operatorname{cm}^2 y + \operatorname{cm}^4 x \,\operatorname{sm}^2 y} \\[4mu]
&\qquad+ \omega \frac{\operatorname{sm} x \,\operatorname{sm} y (\operatorname{cm}^3 x - \operatorname{cm}^3 y )}{\operatorname{sm}^2 x \,\operatorname{cm}^4 y + \operatorname{sm} x \,\operatorname{cm}^2 x \,\operatorname{sm} y \,\operatorname{cm}^2 y + \operatorname{cm}^4 x \,\operatorname{sm}^2 y}
\\[8mu]
\operatorname{sm}(x + \omega y)
&= \frac{ \operatorname{sm}^2 x \,\operatorname{cm} y - \omega^2\,\operatorname{cm} x \,\operatorname{sm}^2 y }
{ \operatorname{sm} x \,\operatorname{cm}^2 y - \omega\,\operatorname{cm}^2 x \,\operatorname{sm} y } \\[4mu]
&= \frac{ \operatorname{sm} x (\operatorname{sm} x \,\operatorname{cm} x \,\operatorname{cm}^2 y + \operatorname{sm} y\,\operatorname{cm}^3 x + \operatorname{sm} y\,\operatorname{cm}^3 y ) }{\operatorname{sm}^2 x \,\operatorname{cm}^4 y + \operatorname{sm} x \,\operatorname{cm}^2 x \,\operatorname{sm} y \,\operatorname{cm}^2 y + \operatorname{cm}^4 x \,\operatorname{sm}^2 y} \\[4mu]
&\qquad+ \omega \frac{ \operatorname{sm} y (\operatorname{sm} x \,\operatorname{cm}^3 x + \operatorname{sm} x \,\operatorname{cm}^3 y + \operatorname{cm}^2 x \,\operatorname{sm} y \,\operatorname{cm} y) }{\operatorname{sm}^2 x \,\operatorname{cm}^4 y + \operatorname{sm} x \,\operatorname{cm}^2 x \,\operatorname{sm} y \,\operatorname{cm}^2 y + \operatorname{cm}^4 x \,\operatorname{sm}^2 y}
\end{aligned}$$

== Multiple-argument identities ==
Argument duplication and triplication identities can be derived from the sum identity:
$$\begin{align}
\operatorname{cm} 2u &= \frac
{ \operatorname{cm}^3 u - \operatorname{sm}^3 u}
{ \operatorname{cm} u (1 + \operatorname{sm}^3 u) } = \frac
{ 2\operatorname{cm}^3 u - 1}
{ 2\operatorname{cm} u - \operatorname{cm}^4 u }, \\[5mu]
\operatorname{sm} 2u &= \frac
{ \operatorname{sm} u (1 + \operatorname{cm}^3 u)}
{ \operatorname{cm} u (1 + \operatorname{sm}^3 u) } = \frac
{ 2\operatorname{sm} u - \operatorname{sm}^4 u}
{ 2\operatorname{cm} u - \operatorname{cm}^4 u }, \\[5mu]
\operatorname{cm} 3u &= \frac
{ \operatorname{cm}^9 u - 6\operatorname{cm}^6 u + 3\operatorname{cm}^3 u + 1}
{ \operatorname{cm}^9 u + 3\operatorname{cm}^6 u - 6\operatorname{cm}^3 u + 1}, \\[5mu]
\operatorname{sm} 3u &= \frac
{ 3\operatorname{sm}u\, \operatorname{cm}u (\operatorname{sm}^3u\, \operatorname{cm}^3u - 1)}
{ \operatorname{cm}^9 u + 3\operatorname{cm}^6 u - 6\operatorname{cm}^3 u + 1}.
\end{align}$$

== Specific value identities ==
The $\operatorname{cm}$ function satisfies the identities
$$\begin{align}
\operatorname{cm}\tfrac29\pi_3 &= -\operatorname{cm}\tfrac19 \pi_3\, \operatorname{cm}\tfrac49\pi_3, \\[5mu]
\operatorname{cm}\tfrac14\pi_3 &= \operatorname{cl}\tfrac13\varpi,
\end{align}$$
where $\operatorname{cl}$ is lemniscate cosine and $\varpi$ is Lemniscate constant.

== Power series ==
The cm and sm functions can be approximated for $|z| < \tfrac13\pi_3$ by the Taylor series
$$\begin{aligned}
\operatorname{cm} z &= c_0 + c_1z^3 + c_2z^6 + c_3z^{9} + \cdots + c_nz^{3n} + \cdots \\[4mu]
\operatorname{sm} z &= s_0z + s_1z^4 + s_2z^7 + s_3z^{10} + \cdots + s_nz^{3n+1} + \cdots
\end{aligned}$$
whose coefficients satisfy the recurrence $c_0 = s_0 = 1,$
$$\begin{aligned}
c_n &= -\frac{1}{3n}\sum_{k=0}^{n-1} s_ks_{n-1-k} \\[4mu]
s_n &= \frac{1}{3n + 1}\sum_{k=0}^n c_kc_{n-k}
\end{aligned}$$

These recurrences result in:
$$\begin{aligned}
\operatorname{cm} z &= 1 - \frac{1}{3}z^3 + \frac{1}{18}z^6 - \frac{23}{2268}z^{9} + \frac{25}{13608}z^{12} - \frac{619}{1857492}z^{15} + \cdots  \\[8mu]
\operatorname{sm} z &= z -\frac{1}{6}z^4 + \frac{2}{63}z^7 - \frac{13}{2268}z^{10} + \frac{23}{22113}z^{13} - \frac{2803}{14859936}z^{16} + \cdots
\end{aligned}$$

== Relation to other elliptic functions ==
=== Weierstrass elliptic function ===
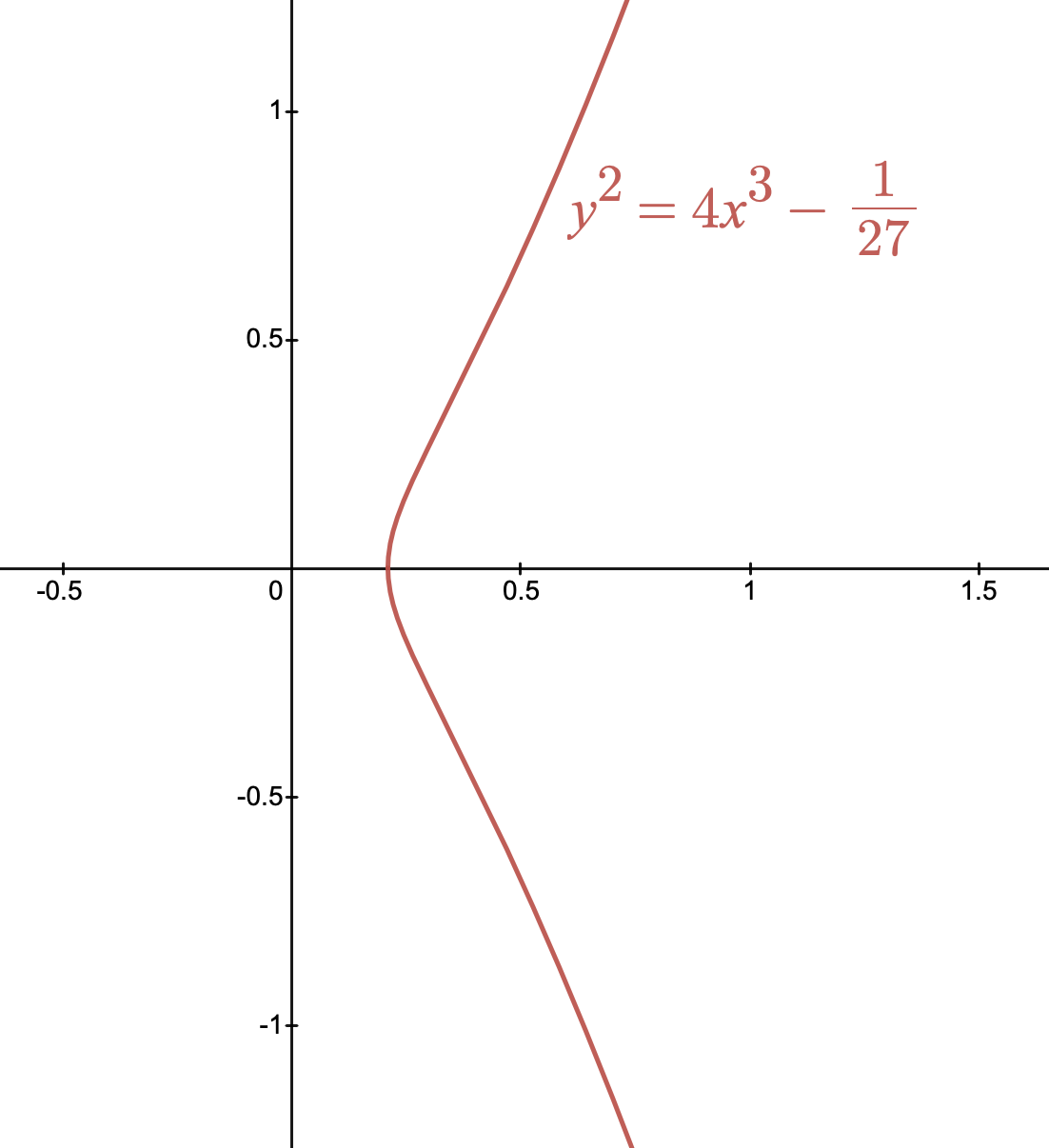
Elliptic curve y^{2} = 4x^{3} − 1/27 for the Weierstrass ℘-function z ↦ ℘(z; 0, 1/27) related to the Dixon elliptic functions.

The equianharmonic Weierstrass elliptic function $\wp(z) = \wp\bigl(z; 0, \tfrac1{27}\bigr),$ with lattice $\Lambda = \pi_3\mathbb{Z} \oplus \pi_3\omega\mathbb{Z}$ a scaling of the Eisenstein integers, can be defined as:
$$\wp(z) = \frac{1}{z^2} + \sum_{\lambda\in\Lambda\smallsetminus\{0\}}\!\left(\frac 1 {(z-\lambda)^2} - \frac 1 {\lambda^2}\right)$$

The function $\wp(z)$ solves the differential equation:
$$\wp'(z)^2 = 4\wp(z)^3 - \tfrac1{27}$$

We can also write it as the inverse of the integral:
$$z = \int_\infty^{\wp(z)} \frac{dw}{\sqrt{4w^3 - \tfrac1{27}}}$$

In terms of $\wp(z)$, the Dixon elliptic functions can be written:
$$\operatorname{cm} z = \frac{3\wp'(z) + 1}{3\wp'(z) - 1},\ \operatorname{sm} z = \frac{-6\wp(z)}{3\wp'(z) - 1}$$

Likewise, the Weierstrass elliptic function $\wp(z) = \wp\bigl(z; 0, \tfrac1{27}\bigr)$ can be written in terms of Dixon elliptic functions:
$$\wp'(z) = \frac{\operatorname{cm} z + 1}{3(\operatorname{cm} z - 1)},\ \wp(z)  = \frac{-\operatorname{sm} z}{3(\operatorname{cm} z - 1)}$$

=== Jacobi elliptic functions ===
The Dixon elliptic functions can also be expressed using Jacobi elliptic functions, which was first observed by Cayley. Let $k = e^{5 i \pi / 6}$, $\theta = 3^{\frac{1}{4}} e^{5 i \pi / 12}$, $s = \operatorname {sn}(u,k)$, $c = \operatorname {cn}(u,k)$, and $d = \operatorname {dn}(u,k)$. Then, let
$$\xi(u) = \frac{-1 + \theta scd}{1 + \theta scd},\ \eta(u) = \frac{2^{1/3} \left( 1+ \theta^2 s^2\right)}{1 + \theta scd}.$$

Finally, the Dixon elliptic functions are as so:
$$\operatorname {sm}(z) = \xi \left(\frac{z + \pi_3/6}{2^{1/3} \theta}\right),\ \operatorname {cm}(z) = \eta \left(\frac{z + \pi_3/6}{2^{1/3} \theta}\right).$$

== Generalized trigonometry ==
Several definitions of generalized trigonometric functions include the usual trigonometric sine and cosine as an $n = 2$ case, and the functions sm and cm as an $n = 3$ case.

For example, defining $\pi_n = \Beta\bigl(\tfrac1n, \tfrac1n\bigr)$ and $\sin_n z,\,\cos_n z$ the inverses of an integral:
$$z = \int_0^{\sin_n z} \frac{dw}{(1 - w^n)^{(n-1)/n}} = \int_{\cos_n z}^1 \frac{dw}{(1 - w^n)^{(n-1)/n}}$$

The area in the positive quadrant under the curve $x^n + y^n = 1$ is
$$\int_0^1 (1 - x^n)^{1/n} \, \mathrm{d}x = \frac{\pi_n}{2n}.$$

The quartic $n = 4$ case results in a square lattice in the complex plane, related to the lemniscate elliptic functions.

== Applications ==
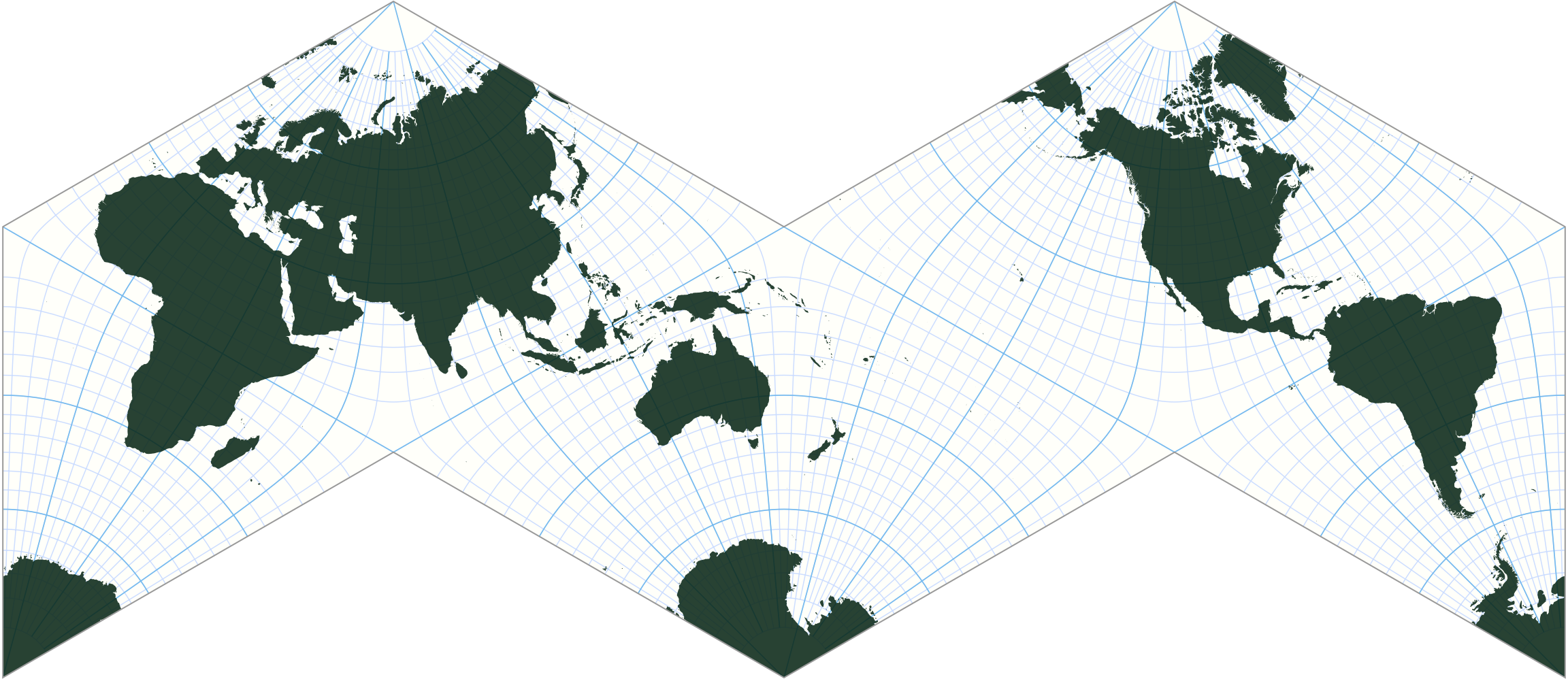
A conformal map projection of the globe onto an octahedron. Because the octahedron has equilateral triangle faces, this projection can be described in terms of sm and cm functions.

The Dixon elliptic functions are conformal maps from an equilateral triangle to a disk, and are therefore helpful for constructing polyhedral conformal map projections involving equilateral triangles, for example projecting the sphere onto a triangle, hexagon, tetrahedron, octahedron, or icosahedron.

== See also ==
- Eisenstein integer
- Elliptic function
  - Abel elliptic functions
  - Jacobi elliptic functions
  - Lemniscate elliptic functions
  - Weierstrass elliptic function
- Lee conformal world in a tetrahedron
- Schwarz–Christoffel mapping
