= Equianharmonic =

In mathematics, and in particular the study of Weierstrass elliptic functions, the equianharmonic case occurs when the Weierstrass invariants satisfy g_{2} = 0 and g_{3} = 1. This page follows the terminology of Abramowitz and Stegun; see also the lemniscatic case. (These are special examples of complex multiplication.)

In the equianharmonic case, the minimal half period ω_{2} is real and equal to

$$\frac{\Gamma^3(1/3)}{4\pi}$$

where $\Gamma$ is the Gamma function. The half period is

$$\omega_1=\tfrac{1}{2}(-1+\sqrt3i)\omega_2.$$

Here the period lattice is a real multiple of the Eisenstein integers.

The constants e_{1}, e_{2} and e_{3} are given by

$$e_1=4^{-1/3}e^{(2/3)\pi i},\qquad
e_2=4^{-1/3},\qquad
e_3=4^{-1/3}e^{-(2/3)\pi i}.$$

The case g_{2} = 0, g_{3} = a may be handled by a scaling transformation.
