= Laurence Patrick Lee =

New Zealand mathematician and geodesist (1913–1985)

- Born: 1913; England
- Died: 28 January 1985 (aged 71–72); Wellington, New Zealand
- Education: University of Auckland (BS)
- Scientific career
- Fields: Geodesy; cartography
- Workplaces: Department of Lands and Survey, Wellington, New Zealand

Laurence Patrick "Laurie" Lee (1913 – 28 January 1985) was a New Zealand mathematician, geodesist, and cartographer who was the Chief Computer for the Department of Lands and Survey and one of the foremost experts on (especially conformal) map projections.

== Life and career ==
Lee was born in England in 1913, but moved with his family to Auckland, New Zealand at a young age. After earning a Bachelor of Science degree from the University of Auckland, he took a job in 1934 in the Department of Public Works in Whangārei, then transferred in 1936 to the Department of Lands and Survey in Auckland as a draughting cadet. Because of his mathematical talents, in 1941 he was sent to Wellington as a computer, where he remained until his retirement in 1974, serving as the Chief Computer for the department from 1964 to 1974. After retirement he continued consulting for the department.

Lee had a stammer since childhood. In 1950, after reading about research psychologist William Kerr of Jersey, who claimed to have discovered a cure, Lee took a leave of absence from the Department of Lands and Survey and worked as an engineer's steward in return for passage to England on the Trojan Star. Kerr's method involved pronouncing each syllable separately with a slight pause between, in a regular rhythm, with a result "described as mechanical, stilted, and artificial". According to a newspaper report, after staying with Kerr for two weeks Lee considered himself effectively cured, with only a slight occasional stammer remaining.

Lee was a lifelong bachelor.

== Work ==
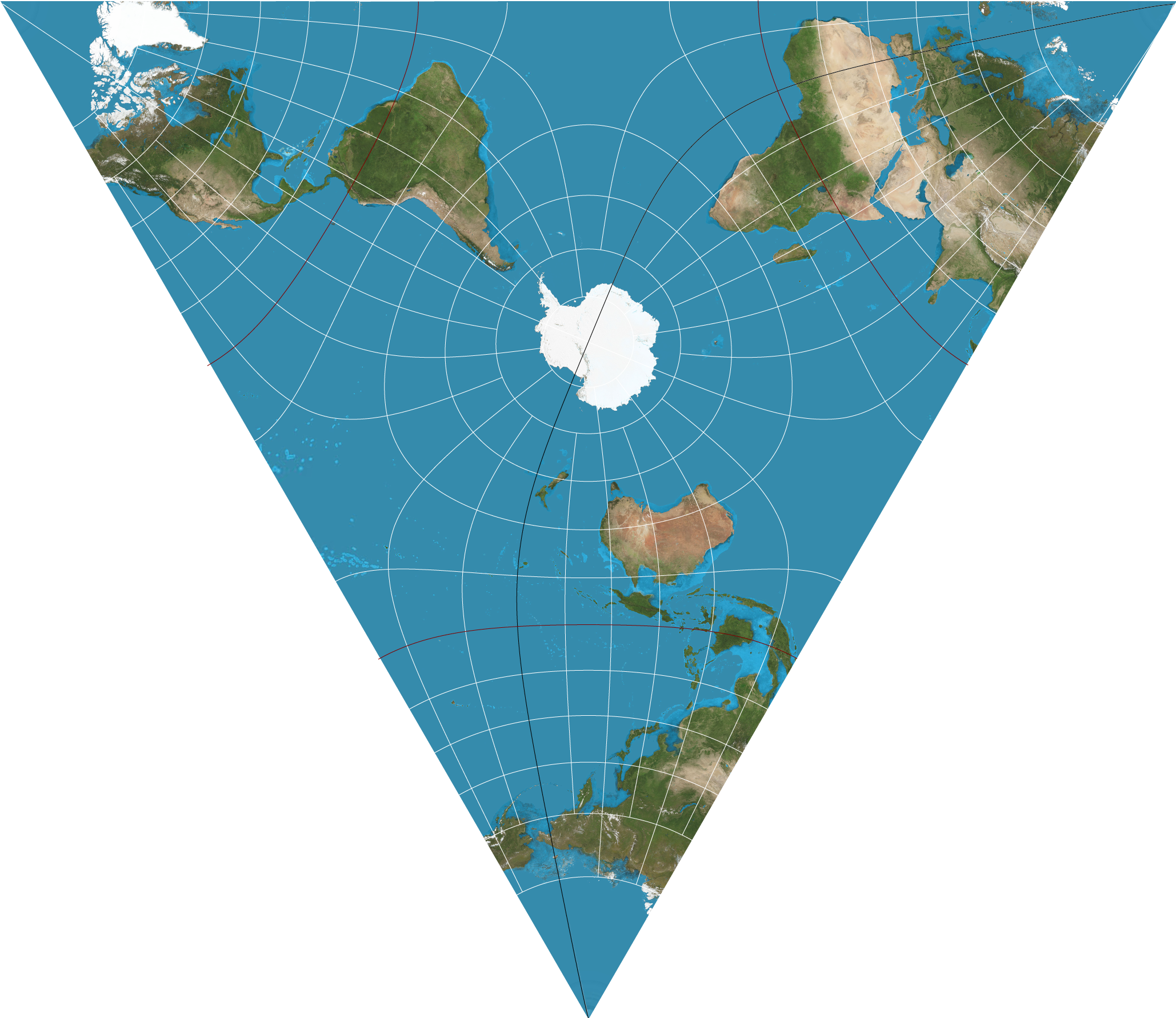
Lee's Conformal Tetrahedric Projection can be computed using Dixon elliptic functions.

At the Department of Lands and Survey, Lee was involved with completing the First Order Geodetic Triangulation of New Zealand, and establishing the Geodetic Datum 1949; the change to metric units; and computations for the latitude and longitude program of the International Geophysical Year, 1957–1959.

Lee was a specialist in map projections – especially conformal projections, which preserve angles and local shapes – and wrote many papers on the subject. Notably, he developed improved methods for calculating the transverse Mercator projection; developed a conformal projection of the Pacific Ocean minimising scale errors; and computed new conformal polyhedral map projections using elliptic functions, building on the work of Oscar S. Adams. His 1976 monograph Conformal Projections Based on Elliptic Functions is still a definitive survey. His 1944 proposal for classifying map projections has been widely adopted and built upon.

Lee joined New Zealand's Royal Astronomical Society in 1948 and was Director of the Society's Computing Section from 1954 to 1972. From 1974 to 1977 he was an editor for the Society's quarterly journal, Southern Stars. He was a founding member of the New Zealand Institute of Draughtsmen and edited its journal from 1947 to 1950, a founding member of the New Zealand Cartographic Society, and was made an honorary member of the New Zealand Institute of Surveyors in 1971.

== Bibliography ==
=== Papers ===
- Lee, L. P. (1944), "The Nomenclature and Classification of Map Projections", Empire Survey Review, 7 (51): 190–200, doi:10.1179/sre.1944.7.51.190 (Retyped PDF)
- —— (1945), "The Transverse Mercator Projection of the Spheroid", Empire Survey Review, 8 (58): 142–152, doi:10.1179/sre.1945.8.58.142
- —— (1946), "Marginal Scales of Latitude and Longitude on Transverse Mercator Maps", Empire Survey Review, 8 (60): 220–221, doi:10.1179/sre.1946.8.60.220
- —— (1946), "The Nomenclature of Map Projections", Empire Survey Review, 8 (60): 217–219, doi:10.1179/sre.1946.8.60.217
- —— (1946), "The Convergence of Meridians", Empire Survey Review, 8 (61): 267–271, doi:10.1179/sre.1946.8.61.267
- —— (1947), "A Stereographic Device for the Solution of Spherical Triangles", Empire Survey Review, 9 (65): 123–131, doi:10.1179/sre.1947.9.65.123
- —— (1947), "The Equidistant Azimuthal Projection of the Sphere", New Zealand Geographer, 3 (1): 41–58, doi:10.1111/j.1745-7939.1947.tb01219.x
- —— (1947), "New Zealand Time", New Zealand Geographer, 3 (2): 197–199, doi:10.1111/j.1745-7939.1947.tb01466.x
- —— (1950), "Note on the Reduction of Circummeridian Altitudes to the Meridian", Empire Survey Review, 10 (78): 366–368, doi:10.1179/sre.1950.10.78.366; correction in Empire Survey Review, 11 (81): 143, 1951, doi:10.1179/sre.1951.11.81.143
- —— (1952), "The Geodetic Datum 1949", New Zealand Survey Draughting Journal, 1: 320–324
- —— (1953), "A Transverse Mercator Projection of the Spheroid Alternative to the Gauss-Krueger Form", Empire Survey Review, 12 (87): 12–17, doi:10.1179/sre.1953.12.87.12
- —— (1954), "Conventions and Generalized Formulae for the Astronomical Triangle", Empire Survey Review, 12 (94): 372–376, doi:10.1179/sre.1954.12.94.372
- —— (1954), "The Oblique Mercator Projection", New Zealand Geographer, 10 (2): 151–164, doi:10.1111/j.1745-7939.1954.tb01308.x; reprinted as "The Oblique Mercator Projection", Empire Survey Review, 13 (101): 321–335, 1956, doi:10.1179/sre.1956.13.101.321
- —— (1962), "The Transverse Mercator Projection of the Entire Spheroid", Empire Survey Review, 16 (123): 208–217, doi:10.1179/sre.1962.16.123.208
- —— (1963), "Scale and Convergence in the Transverse Mercator Projection of the Entire Spheroid", Survey Review, 17 (127): 49–51, doi:10.1179/sre.1963.17.127.49
- —— (1965), "Some Conformal Projections Based on Elliptic Functions", Geographical Review, 55 (4): 563–580, doi:10.2307/212415, JSTOR 212415
- —— (1970), "Astronomical Notation", Survey Review, 20 (156): 290–292, doi:10.1179/sre.1970.20.156.290
- —— (1973), "The Conformal Tetrahedric Projection with some Practical Applications", The Cartographic Journal, 10 (1): 22–28, doi:10.1179/caj.1973.10.1.22
- —— (1974), "A Conformal Projection for the Map of the Pacific", New Zealand Geographer, 30 (1): 75–77, doi:10.1111/j.1745-7939.1974.tb00757.x
- —— (1974), "The Computation of Conformal Projections", Survey Review, 22 (172): 245–256, doi:10.1179/sre.1974.22.172.245
- —— (1975), "Conformal Projection with Specified Scale at Selected Points", Survey Review, 23 (178): 187–188, doi:10.1179/sre.1975.23.178.187

=== Books ===
- Lee, L. P. (1976), Conformal Projections Based on Elliptic Functions, Cartographica Monographs, vol. 16, Toronto: B. V. Gutsell, York University, ISBN 0-919870-16-3, supplement no. 1 to The Canadian Cartographer 13
- —— (1978), First-order, Geodetic Triangulation of New Zealand, 1909-49 and 1973-74 (PDF), Wellington: Department of Lands and Survey, Bibcode:1978fgtn.book.....L, LCCN 80-476174

=== Selected maps ===
- Lee, L. P. (1945) "Map showing great circle distances and azimuths from Wellington to all parts of the world", NZMS 47, Wellington: Department of Lands and Survey (Zoomable image); 2nd ed. 1953
- —— (1974) "The Pacific", NZMS 276, Wellington: Department of Lands and Survey (Zoomable image); 2nd ed. 1976 (Zoomable image); 3rd ed. 1984 (Zoomable image)
- McLintock, A. H., ed. (1959), A Descriptive Atlas of New Zealand, Wellington: Government Printer; "Maps for A Descriptive Atlas of New Zealand", NZMS 124, Wellington: Department of Lands and Survey (Zoomable images); Lee computed the small scale overview maps at the beginning.
