= Half-period ratio =

Elliptic functions

In mathematics, the half-period ratio τ of an elliptic function is the ratio

$$\tau = \frac{\omega_2}{\omega_1}$$

of the two half-periods $\frac{\omega_1}{2}$ and $\frac{\omega_2}{2}$ of the elliptic function, where the elliptic function is defined in such a way that

$$\Im(\tau) > 0$$

is in the upper half-plane.

Quite often in the literature, ω_{1} and ω_{2} are defined to be the periods of an elliptic function rather than its half-periods. Regardless of the choice of notation, the ratio ω_{2}/ω_{1} of periods is identical to the ratio (ω_{2}/2)/(ω_{1}/2) of half-periods. Hence, the period ratio is the same as the "half-period ratio".

Note that the half-period ratio can be thought of as a simple number, namely, one of the parameters of elliptic functions, or it can be thought of as a function itself, because the half periods can be given in terms of the elliptic modulus or in terms of the nome. See the pages on quarter period and elliptic integrals for additional definitions and relations on the arguments and parameters to elliptic functions.

== See also ==
- Modular form
- Nome
