= Alfred Cardew Dixon =

English mathematician

Sir Alfred Cardew Dixon Bt FRS
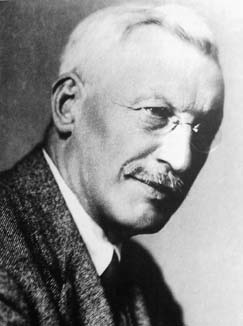
- Born: 22 May 1865; Northallerton, Yorkshire, England
- Died: 4 May 1936 (aged 70); Northwood, Middlesex, England
- Education: University of London; Trinity College, Cambridge
- Known for: Dixon elliptic functions Dixon's identity
- Awards: Smith's Prize
- Scientific career
- Fields: Mathematics
- Workplaces: Cambridge University; Queen's College, Galway; Queen's University Belfast

Sir Alfred Cardew Dixon, 1st Baronet Warford (22 May 1865 – 4 May 1936) was an English mathematician.

== Biography ==
Dixon was born on 22 May 1865 in Northallerton, Yorkshire, England. He studied at the University of London and graduated with an MA. He entered Trinity College, Cambridge, in 1883 and graduated as Senior Wrangler in the Mathematical Tripos in 1886. In 1888, Dixon was awarded the second Smith's Prize, and also appointed a Fellow of Trinity College, Cambridge. He took the degree of Sc.D. at Cambridge University in 1897. He was Professor of Mathematics at Queen's College, Galway, from 1893 to 1901. In 1901 he was appointed to the chair at Queen's University Belfast, which he held till 1930, receiving the title of Emeritus Professor on retirement.

Dixon was elected to the Royal Society in 1904 and after he retired from Queen's University Belfast, he served as president of the London Mathematical Society from 1931 until 1933. Queen's University Belfast conferred on him the honorary degree of D.Sc. in 1932.

== Research work ==
Dixon was well known for his work in differential equations. He did early work on Fredholm integrals independently of Fredholm. He worked both on ordinary differential equations and on partial differential equations studying Abelian integrals, automorphic functions, and functional equations.

In 1894 Dixon wrote The Elementary Properties of the Elliptic Functions. Certain elliptic functions (meromorphic doubly periodic functions) denoted cm and sm satisfying the identity cm(z)^{3} + sm(z)^{3} = 1 are known as Dixon elliptic functions.

Dixon's identity is any of several closely related identities involving binomial coefficients and hypergeometric functions.
