= Sigma function =

In mathematics, by sigma function one can mean one of the following:

- The sum-of-divisors function σ_{a}(n), an arithmetic function
- Weierstrass sigma function, related to elliptic functions
- Rado's sigma function, see busy beaver

See also sigmoid function.
