= Laurence Lee =

Laurence Lee can refer to:

- Laurence Patrick Lee (1913–1985), New Zealand cartographer
- Laurence Edward Alan Lee (known as Laurie Lee, 1914–1997), English writer
