= Fundamenta nova theoriae functionum ellipticarum =

1829 book on mathematics by Carl G.J. Jacobi

Fundamenta Nova Theoriae Functionum Ellipticarum
- First edition
- Author: Carl Gustav Jacob Jacobi
- Language: Latin
- Subject: Jacobi elliptic functions
- Genre: Non-fiction
- Publication date: 1829
- Media type: Print

Fundamenta nova theoriae functionum ellipticarum (from Latin: New Foundations of the Theory of Elliptic Functions) is a treatise on elliptic functions by German mathematician Carl Gustav Jacob Jacobi. The book was first published in 1829, and has been reprinted in volume 1 of his collected works and on several later occasions. The book introduces Jacobi elliptic functions and the Jacobi triple product identity.

One of the most exciting moments of my life was when, after computing several of these series, I went down to our mathematical library and found some of them in Jacobi's "Fundamenta nova theoriae..."[3], with the same coefficients down to the last decimal digit!

— Conway (1980, p.171) describing the discovery of monstrous moonshine.
