= Weierstrass sigma, zeta, and eta functions =

Mathematical functions related to Weierstrass's elliptic function

In mathematics, the Weierstrass sigma, zeta, and eta functions are special functions of a complex variable that are auxiliary to the Weierstrass elliptic function. They are named for Karl Weierstrass. The relation between the sigma, zeta, and $\wp$ functions is analogous to that between the sine, cotangent, and squared cosecant functions: the logarithmic derivative of the sine is the cotangent, whose derivative is negative the squared cosecant.

== Weierstrass sigma function ==
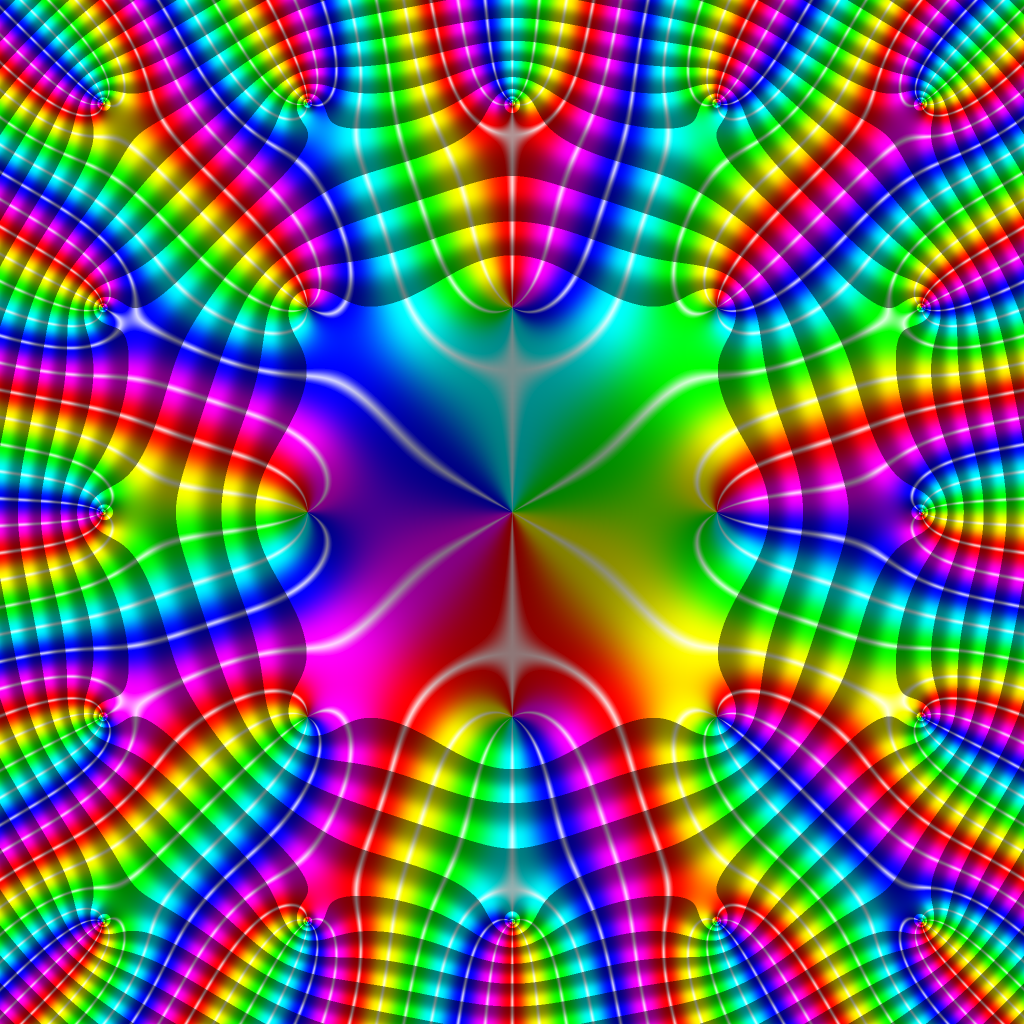
Plot of the sigma function using Domain coloring.

The Weierstrass sigma function associated to a two-dimensional lattice $\Lambda\subset\Complex$ is defined to be the product

$$\begin{align}
\operatorname{\sigma}{(z;\Lambda)}
&= z\prod_{w\in\Lambda^{*}}\left(1-\frac{z}{w}\right)
\exp\left(\frac zw + \frac12\left(\frac zw\right)^2\right) \\[5mu]
&= z\prod_{\begin{smallmatrix}m,n=-\infty \\ \{m,n\}\neq0\end{smallmatrix}}^\infty
\left(1 - \frac{z}{m\omega_1 + n\omega_2}\right)
\exp{\left(\frac{z}{m\omega_1 + n\omega_2} + \frac{1}{2}\left(\frac{z}{m\omega_1 + n\omega_2}\right)^2\right)}
\end{align}$$

where $\Lambda^{*}$ denotes $\Lambda-\{ 0 \}$ and $(\omega_1,\omega_2)$ is a fundamental pair of periods.

Through careful manipulation of the Weierstrass factorization theorem as it relates also to the sine function, another potentially more manageable infinite product definition is

$$\operatorname{\sigma}{(z;\Lambda)}
= \frac{\omega_i}{\pi} \exp{\left(\frac{\eta_i z^2}{\omega_i}\right)} \sin{\left(\frac{\pi z}{\omega_i}\right)}\prod_{n=1}^\infty\left(1-\frac{\sin^2{\left(\pi z/\omega_i\right)}}{\sin^2{\left(n\pi\omega_j/\omega_i\right)}}\right)$$

for any $\{i,j\}\in\{1,2,3\}$ with $i\neq j$ and where we have used the notation $\eta_i=\zeta(\omega_i/2;\Lambda)$ (see zeta function below). Also it is a "quasi-periodic" function, with the following property:

$\sigma(z+2\omega_i)=-e^{2\eta_i(z+\omega_i)}\sigma(z)$

The sigma function can be used to represent an elliptic function: $f(z+\omega_i)=f(z) \quad i \in \{1,\ldots,n \}$ when knowing its zeros and poles that lie in the period parallelogram:

  
    
      
        f
        (
        z
        )
        =
        c
        
          ∏
          
            j
            =
            1
          
          
            n
          
        
        
          
            
              σ
              (
              z
              −
              
                a
                
                  j
                
              
              )
            
            
              σ
              (
              z
              −
              
                b
                
                  j
                
              
              )
            
          
        
      
    
    {\displaystyle f(z)=c\prod _{j=1}^{n}{\frac {\sigma (z-a_{j})}{\sigma (z-b_{j})}}}
  

Where $c$ is a constant in $\mathbb{C}$ and $a_j$ are the zeros in the parallelogram and $b_j$ are the poles

== Weierstrass zeta function ==
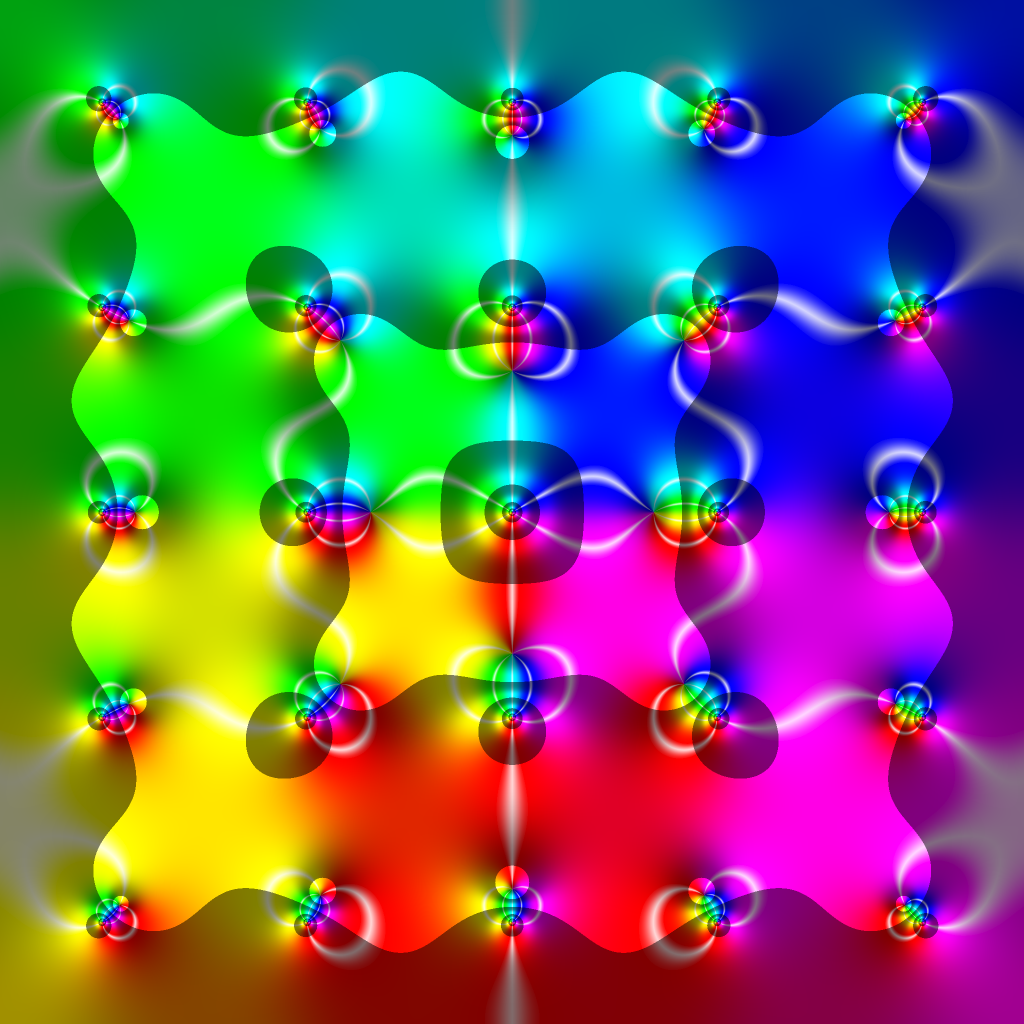
Plot of the zeta function using Domain coloring

The Weierstrass zeta function is defined by the sum

$$\operatorname{\zeta}{(z;\Lambda)}=\frac{\sigma'(z;\Lambda)}{\sigma(z;\Lambda)}=\frac{1}{z}+\sum_{w\in\Lambda^{*}}\left( \frac{1}{z-w}+\frac{1}{w}+\frac{z}{w^2}\right).$$

The Weierstrass zeta function is the logarithmic derivative of the sigma-function. The zeta function can be rewritten as:

$$\operatorname{\zeta}{(z;\Lambda)}=\frac{1}{z}-\sum_{k=1}^{\infty}\mathcal{G}_{2k+2}(\Lambda)z^{2k+1}$$

where $\mathcal{G}_{2k+2}$ is the Eisenstein series of weight 2k + 2.

The derivative of the zeta function is $-\wp(z)$, where $\wp(z)$ is the Weierstrass elliptic function.

The Weierstrass zeta function should not be confused with the Riemann zeta function in number theory.

== Weierstrass eta function ==
The Weierstrass eta function is defined to be

$\eta(w;\Lambda)=\zeta(z+w;\Lambda)-\zeta(z;\Lambda), \mbox{ for any } z \in \Complex$ and any w in the lattice $\Lambda$

This is well-defined, i.e. $\zeta(z+w;\Lambda)-\zeta(z;\Lambda)$ only depends on the lattice vector w. The Weierstrass eta function should not be confused with either the Dedekind eta function or the Dirichlet eta function.

== Weierstrass ℘-function ==
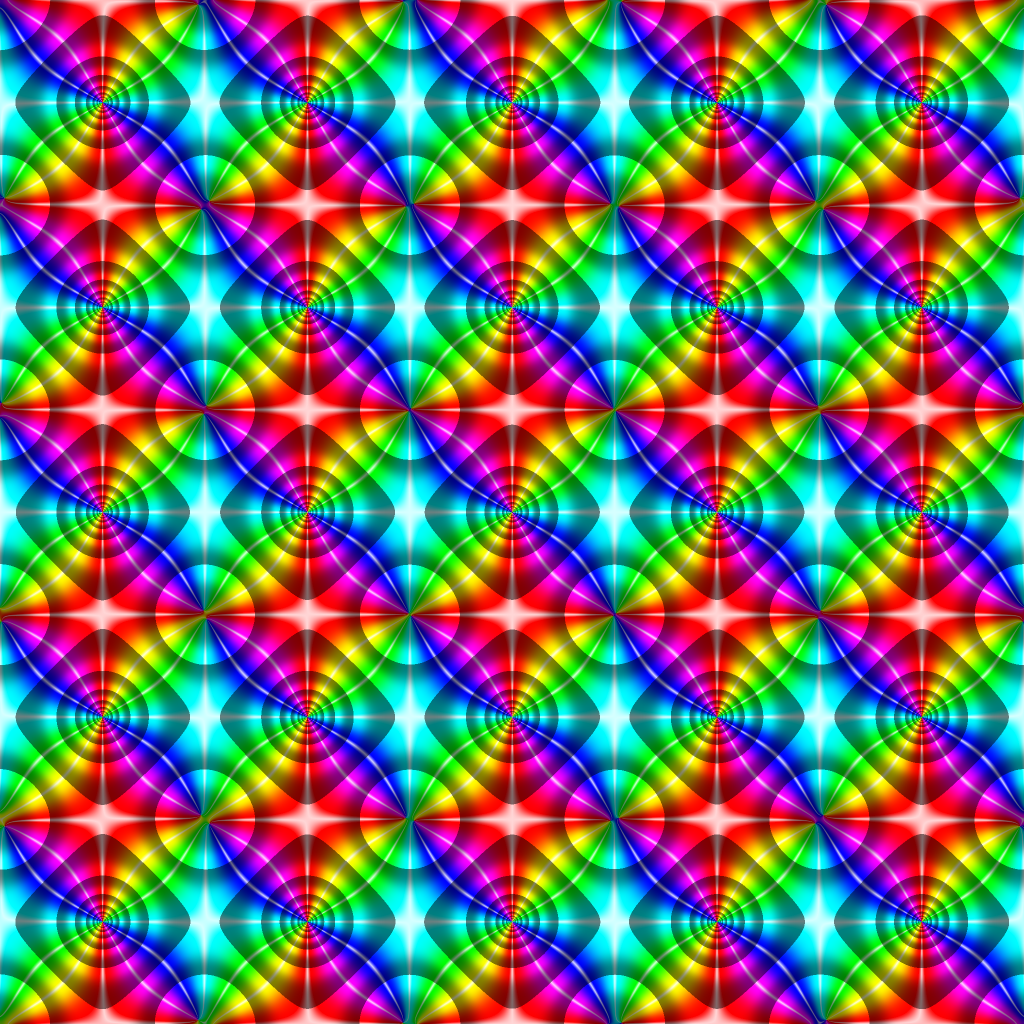
Plot of the p-function using Domain coloring

The Weierstrass p-function is related to the zeta function by

$$\operatorname{\wp}{(z;\Lambda)}= -\operatorname{\zeta'}{(z;\Lambda)}, \mbox{ for any } z \in \Complex$$

The Weierstrass ℘-function is an even elliptic function of order N=2 with a double pole at each lattice point and no other poles.

== Degenerate case ==
Consider the situation where one period is real, which we can scale to be $\omega_1=2\pi$ and the other is taken to the limit of $\omega_2\rightarrow i\infty$ so that the functions are only singly-periodic. The corresponding invariants are $\{g_2,g_3\}=\left\{\tfrac{1}{12},\tfrac{1}{216}\right\}$ of discriminant $\Delta=0$. Then we have $\eta_1=\tfrac{\pi}{12}$ and thus from the above infinite product definition the following equality:

$$\operatorname{\sigma}{(z;\Lambda)}=2e^{z^2/24}\sin{\left(\tfrac{z}{2}\right)}$$

A generalization for other sine-like functions on other doubly-periodic lattices is

$$f(z)=\frac{\pi}{\omega_1} e^{-(4\eta_1/\omega_1)z^2} \operatorname{\sigma}{(2z;\Lambda)}$$
