= Lee conformal world in a tetrahedron =

Polyhedral conformal map projection

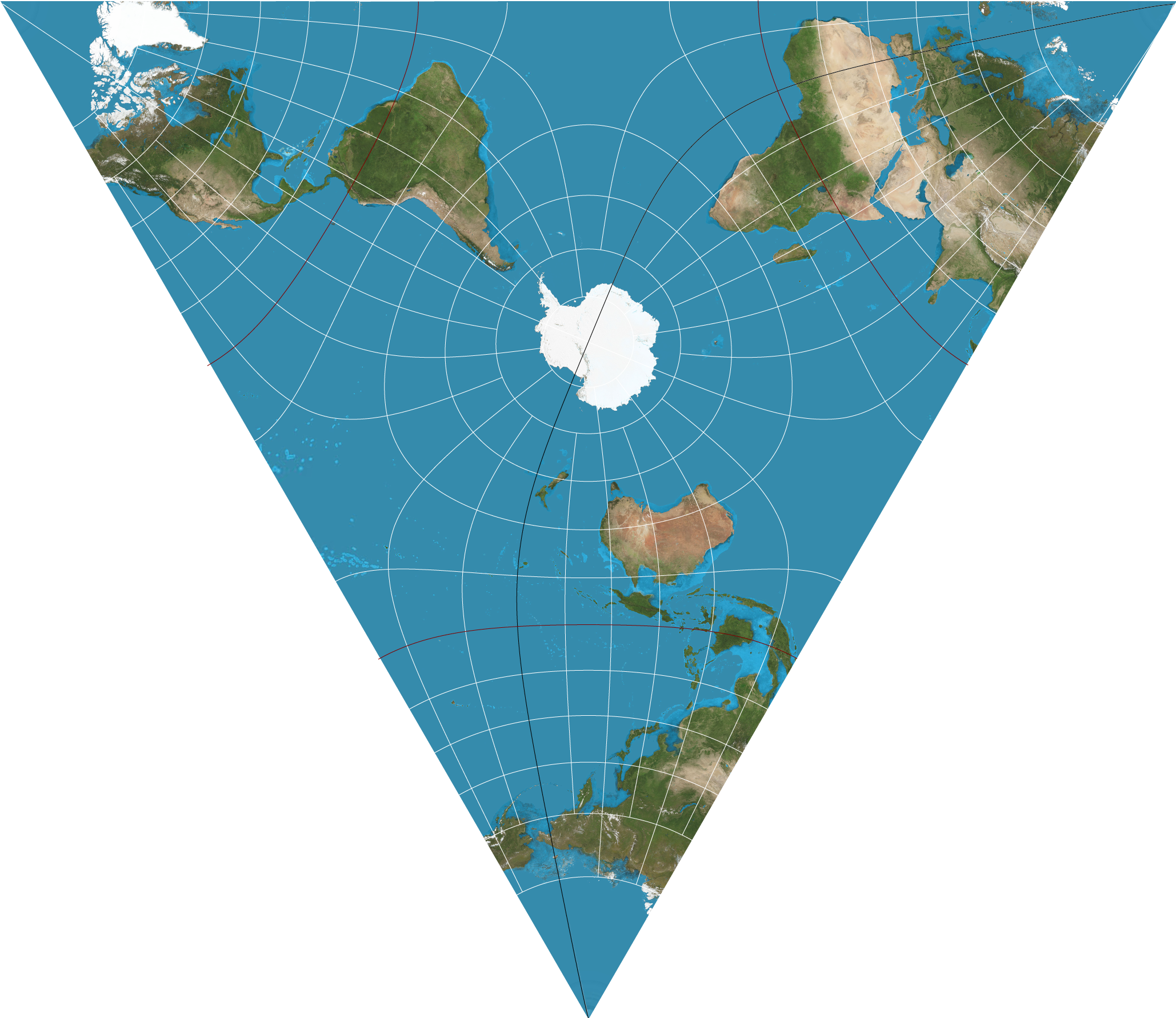
Lee conformal tetrahedric projection of the world centered on the south pole.

The Lee conformal world in a tetrahedron with Tissot's indicatrix of deformation.

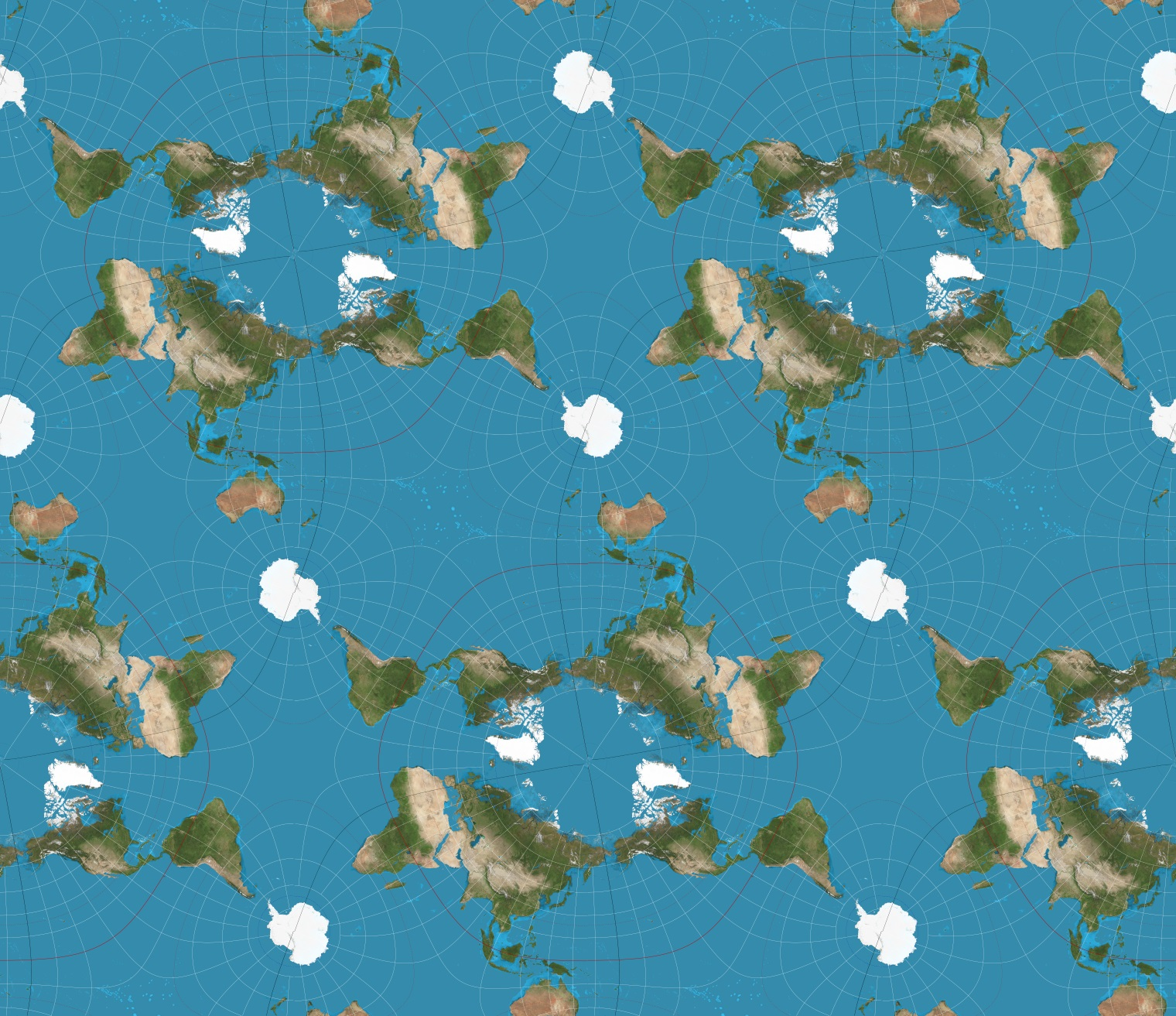
Lee conformal tetrahedric projection tessellated several times in the plane.

The Lee conformal world in a tetrahedron is a polyhedral, conformal map projection that projects the globe onto a tetrahedron using Dixon elliptic functions. It is conformal everywhere except for the four singularities at the vertices of the polyhedron. Because of the nature of polyhedra, this map projection can be tessellated infinitely in the plane. It was developed by Laurence Patrick Lee in 1965.

Coordinates from a spherical datum can be transformed into Lee conformal projection coordinates with the following formulas, where $\lambda$ is the longitude and $\varphi$ the latitude:
$$2 \operatorname{sm}w\,\operatorname{cm}w = 2^{5/6}\exp(i\lambda) \tan\bigl(\tfrac14\pi - \tfrac12\varphi\bigr)$$
where
$$w = x + y i$$
and sm and cm are Dixon elliptic functions.

Since there is no elementary expression for these functions, Lee suggests using the 28th-degree MacLaurin series.

== See also ==
- List of map projections
- AuthaGraph projection, another tetrahedral projection, 1999
- Dymaxion map, 1943
- Peirce quincuncial projection, 1879
- Polyhedral map projection, earliest known is by Leonardo da Vinci, 1514
