= Eisenstein integer =

Complex number whose mapping on a coordinate plane produces a triangular lattice

In mathematics, the Eisenstein integers (named after Gotthold Eisenstein), occasionally also known as Eulerian integers (after Leonhard Euler), are the complex numbers of the form

$$z = a + b\omega ,$$

where a and b are integers and

$$\omega = \frac{-1 + i\sqrt 3}{2} = e^{i2\pi/3}$$

is a primitive (hence non-real) cube root of unity.

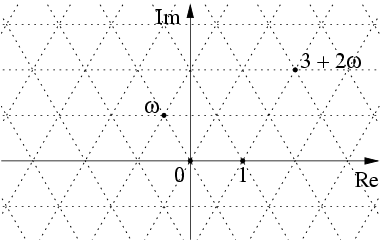
Eisenstein integers as the points of a certain triangular lattice in the complex plane

The Eisenstein integers form a triangular lattice in the complex plane, in contrast with the Gaussian integers, which form a square lattice in the complex plane. The Eisenstein integers are a countably infinite set.

== Properties ==
The Eisenstein integers form a commutative ring Z[ω] of algebraic integers in the algebraic number field Q(ω) – the third cyclotomic field. To see that the Eisenstein integers are algebraic integers note that each z = a + bω is a root of the monic polynomial

$$z^2 - (2a - b)\;\!z + \left(a^2 - ab + b^2\right)~.$$

In particular, ω satisfies the equation

$$\omega^2 + \omega + 1 = 0~.$$

The product of two Eisenstein integers a + bω and c + dω is given explicitly by

$$(a + b\;\!\omega) \;\! (c + d\;\!\omega)=(ac - bd) + (bc + ad - bd)\;\!\omega~.$$

The 2-norm of an Eisenstein integer is just its squared modulus, and is given by

$${\left|a + b\;\!\omega\right|}^2 \,= \, {(a - \tfrac{1}{2} b)}^2 + \tfrac{3}{4} b^2 \, = \, a^2 - ab + b^2~,$$

which is clearly a positive ordinary (rational) integer.

Also, the complex conjugate of ω satisfies

$$\bar\omega = \omega^2~.$$

The group of units in this ring is the cyclic group formed by the sixth roots of unity in the complex plane: {±1, ±ω, ±ω^{2}}, the Eisenstein integers of norm 1.

== Euclidean domain ==
The ring of Eisenstein integers forms a Euclidean domain whose norm N is given by the square modulus, as above:

$$N(a+b\,\omega) = a^2 - a b + b^2.$$

A division algorithm, applied to any dividend α and divisor β ≠ 0, gives a quotient κ and a remainder ρ smaller than the divisor, satisfying:

$$\alpha = \kappa \beta +\rho \ \ \text{  with  }\ \ N(\rho) < N(\beta).$$

Here, α, β, κ, ρ are all Eisenstein integers. This algorithm implies the Euclidean algorithm, which proves Euclid's lemma and the unique factorization of Eisenstein integers into Eisenstein primes.

One division algorithm is as follows. First perform the division in the field of complex numbers, and write the quotient in terms of ω:

$$\frac{\alpha}{\beta}\ =\ \tfrac{1}{\ |\beta|^2}\alpha\overline{\beta} \ =\ a+bi \ =\  a+\tfrac{1}{\sqrt3}b+\tfrac{2}{\sqrt3}b\omega,$$

for rational a, b ∈ Q. Then obtain the Eisenstein integer quotient by rounding the rational coefficients to the nearest integer:

$$\kappa = \left\lfloor a+\tfrac{1}{\sqrt3}b\right\rceil + \left\lfloor \tfrac{2}{\sqrt3}b\right\rceil\omega \ \ \text{ and }\ \ \rho = {\alpha} - \kappa\beta.$$

Here $\lfloor x\rceil$ may denote any of the standard rounding-to-integer functions.

The reason this satisfies N(ρ) < N(β), while the analogous procedure fails for most other quadratic integer rings, is as follows. A fundamental domain for the ideal Z[ω]β = Zβ + Zωβ, acting by translations on the complex plane, is the 60°–120° rhombus with vertices 0, β, ωβ, β + ωβ. Any Eisenstein integer α lies inside one of the translates of this parallelogram, and the quotient κ is one of its vertices. The remainder is the square distance from α to this vertex, but the maximum possible distance in our algorithm is only $\tfrac{\sqrt3}2 |\beta|$, so $|\rho| \leq \tfrac{\sqrt3}2 |\beta|< |\beta|$. (The size of ρ could be slightly decreased by taking κ to be the closest corner.)

== Eisenstein primes ==
Small Eisenstein primes. Those on the green axes are associate to a natural prime of the form 3n + 2. All others have an absolute value equal to either the square root of 3 or the square root of a natural prime of the form 3n + 1.

Eisenstein primes in a larger range

If x and y are Eisenstein integers, we say that x divides y if there is some Eisenstein integer z such that y = zx. A non-unit Eisenstein integer x is said to be an Eisenstein prime if its only non-unit divisors are of the form ux, where u is any of the six units. They are the corresponding concept to the Gaussian primes in the Gaussian integers.

There are two types of Eisenstein prime.

- an ordinary prime number (or rational prime) which is congruent to 2 mod 3 is also an Eisenstein prime.
- 3 and each rational prime congruent to 1 mod 3 are equal to the norm x^{2} − xy + y^{2} of an Eisenstein integer x + ωy. Thus, such a prime may be factored as (x + ωy)(x + ω^{2}y), and these factors are Eisenstein primes: they are precisely the Eisenstein integers whose norm is a rational prime.

In the second type, factors of 3, $1-\omega$ and $1-\omega^2$ are associates: $1-\omega=(-\omega)(1-\omega^2)$, so it is regarded as a special type in some books.

The first few Eisenstein primes of the form 3n − 1 are:

2, 5, 11, 17, 23, 29, 41, 47, 53, 59, 71, 83, 89, 101, ... (sequence A003627 in the OEIS).

Natural primes that are congruent to 0 or 1 modulo 3 are not Eisenstein primes: they admit nontrivial factorizations in Z[ω]. For example:

3 = −(1 + 2ω)^{2}
7 = (3 + ω)(2 − ω).

In general, if a natural prime p is 1 modulo 3 and can therefore be written as p = a^{2} − ab + b^{2}, then it factorizes over Z[ω] as

p = (a + bω)((a − b) − bω).

Some non-real Eisenstein primes are

2 + ω, 3 + ω, 4 + ω, 5 + 2ω, 6 + ω, 7 + ω, 7 + 3ω.

Up to conjugacy and unit multiples, the primes listed above, together with 2 and 5, are all the Eisenstein primes of absolute value not exceeding 7.

As of October 2023, the largest known real Eisenstein prime is the 12th-largest known prime 10223 × 2^{31172165} + 1, discovered by Péter Szabolcs and PrimeGrid.

== Eisenstein series ==
The sum of the reciprocals of all Eisenstein integers excluding 0 raised to the fourth power is 0:
$$\sum_{z\in\mathbf{E}\setminus\{0\}}\frac{1}{z^4}=G_4\left(e^{\frac{2\pi i}{3}}\right)=0$$
so $e^{2\pi i/3}$ is a root of j-invariant. In general $G_k\left(e^{\frac{2\pi i}{3}}\right)=0$ if and only if $k\not\equiv 0 \pmod 6$.

The sum of the reciprocals of all Eisenstein integers excluding 0 raised to the sixth power can be expressed in terms of the gamma function:
$$\sum_{z\in\mathbf{E}\setminus\{0\}}\frac{1}{z^6}=G_6\left(e^{\frac{2\pi i}{3}}\right)=\frac{\Gamma (1/3)^{18}}{8960\pi^6} \approx 5.86303$$
where E are the Eisenstein integers and G_{6} is the Eisenstein series of weight 6.

== Quotient of C by the Eisenstein integers ==
The quotient of the complex plane C by the lattice containing all Eisenstein integers is a complex torus of real dimension 2. This is one of two tori with maximal symmetry among all such complex tori. This torus can be obtained by identifying each of the three pairs of opposite edges of a regular hexagon.

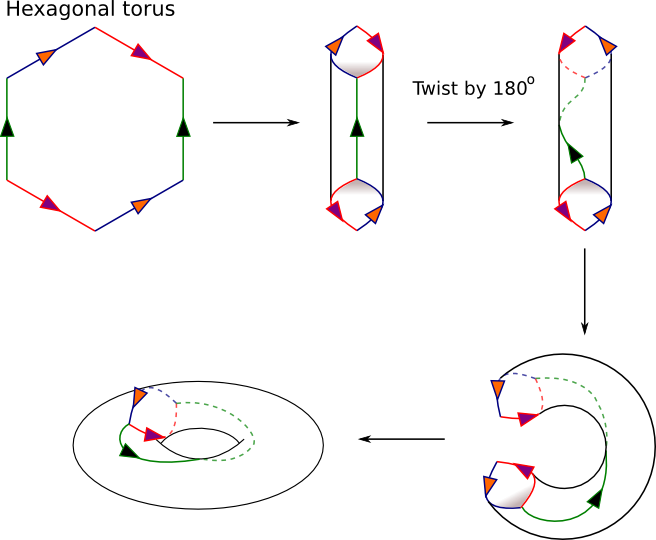
Identifying each of the three pairs of opposite edges of a regular hexagon.

The other maximally symmetric torus is the quotient of the complex plane by the additive lattice of Gaussian integers, and can be obtained by identifying each of the two pairs of opposite sides of a square fundamental domain, such as [0, 1] × [0, 1].

== See also ==
- Gaussian integer
- Cyclotomic field
- Systolic geometry
- Hermite constant
- Cubic reciprocity
- Loewner's torus inequality
- Hurwitz quaternion
- Quadratic integer
- Dixon elliptic functions
- Equianharmonic
