= Doubly periodic function =

Function with two complex number "periods"

In mathematics, a doubly periodic function is a function defined on the complex plane and having two "periods", which are complex numbers $u$ and $v$ that are linearly independent as vectors over the field of real numbers. That $u$ and $v$ are periods of a function $f$ means that
$$f(z + u) = f(z + v) = f(z)\,$$
for all values of the complex number $z$.

The doubly periodic function is thus a two-dimensional extension of the simpler singly periodic function, which repeats itself in a single dimension. Familiar examples of functions with a single period on the real number line include the trigonometric functions like cosine and sine, In the complex plane the exponential function $e^z$ is a singly periodic function, with period $2 \pi i$.

== Examples ==
As an arbitrary mapping from pairs of reals (or complex numbers) to reals, a doubly periodic function can be constructed with little effort. For example, assume that the periods are $1$ and $i$, so that the repeating lattice is the set of unit squares with vertices at the Gaussian integers. Values in the prototype square (i.e. $x + iy$ where $0 \leq x < 1$ and $0 \leq y < 1$) can be assigned rather arbitrarily and then 'copied' to adjacent squares. This function will then be necessarily doubly periodic.

If the vectors $1$ and $i$ in this example are replaced by linearly independent vectors $u$ and $v$, the prototype square becomes a prototype parallelogram that still tiles the plane. The "origin" of the lattice of parallelograms does not have to be the point $0$: the lattice can start from any point. In other words, we can think of the plane and its associated functional values as remaining fixed, and mentally translate the lattice to gain insight into the function's characteristics.

== Use of complex analysis ==
If a doubly periodic function is also a complex function that satisfies the Cauchy–Riemann equations and provides an analytic function away from some set of isolated poles – in other words, a meromorphic function – then a lot of information about such a function can be obtained by applying some basic theorems from complex analysis.

- A non-constant meromorphic doubly periodic function cannot be bounded on the prototype parallelogram. For if it were it would be bounded everywhere, and therefore constant by Liouville's theorem.
- Since the function is meromorphic, it has no essential singularities and its poles are isolated. Therefore a translated lattice that does not pass through any pole can be constructed. The contour integral around any parallelogram in the lattice must vanish, because the values assumed by the doubly periodic function along the two pairs of parallel sides are identical, and the two pairs of sides are traversed in opposite directions as we move around the contour. Therefore, by the residue theorem, the function cannot have a single simple pole inside each parallelogram – it must have at least two simple poles within each parallelogram (Jacobian case), or it must have at least one pole of order greater than one (Weierstrassian case).
- A similar argument can be applied to the function $g = 1 / f$ where $f$ is meromorphic and doubly periodic. Under this inversion the zeroes of $f$ become the poles of $g$, and vice versa. So the meromorphic doubly periodic function $f$ cannot have one simple zero lying within each parallelogram on the lattice—it must have at least two simple zeroes, or it must have at least one zero of multiplicity greater than one. It follows that $f$ cannot attain any value just once, since $f$ minus that value would itself be a meromorphic doubly periodic function with just one zero.

== See also ==
- Elliptic function
  - Abel elliptic functions
  - Jacobi elliptic functions
  - Weierstrass elliptic functions
  - Lemniscate elliptic functions
  - Dixon elliptic functions
- Fundamental pair of periods
- Period mapping

== Literature ==
- Jacobi, C. G. J. (1835). "De functionibus duarum variabilium quadrupliciter periodicis, quibus theoria transcendentium Abelianarum innititur". Journal für die reine und angewandte Mathematik (in Latin). 13. A. L. Crelle. Reimer, Berlin: 55–56. Reprinted in Gesammelte Werke, Vol. 2, 2nd ed. Providence, Rhode Island: American Mathematical Society, pp. 25-26, 1969.
- Whittaker, E. T. and Watson, G. N.: A Course in Modern Analysis, 4th ed. reprinted Cambridge, England: Cambridge University Press, 1963, pp. 429-535. Chapters XX - XXII on elliptic functions, general theorems and Weierstrass elliptic functions, theta functions and Jacobian elliptic functions.
