= Jean Claude Bouquet =

French mathematician

Jean-Claude Bouquet
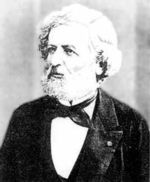
- Born: September 7, 1819; Morteau, France
- Died: September 9, 1885 (aged 66); Paris, France
- Citizenship: French
- Education: University of Paris
- Known for: Variation of double integrals
- Awards: Knight of the Legion of Honor, Officer of the Legion of Honor
- Scientific career
- Fields: Mathematician
- Thesis: Sur la variation des intégrales doubles (1843)

Jean-Claude Bouquet (7 September 1819 – 9 September 1885) was a French mathematician who worked with Charles Briot on doubly periodic functions.

Bouquet became friends with Briot at the Lycée and wanted to become a mathematics teacher.

== Biography ==
The son of a farmer, Jean Claude Bouquet studied at the secondary school level in Lyon, where he obtained Bachelor of Arts and Science degrees. From 1839 to 1842, he studied science at the Ecole Normale and the University of Paris, where he obtained a degree in mathematics and physics in 1841. France was in the midst of the revolution of 1830.

Appointed an associate for the mathematics classes at colleges on September 16. 1842, he was immediately appointed to replace the elementary maths teacher at the Royal College of Marseille. In 1843, he obtained a PhD in Mathematical Sciences with a master thesis on variation of double integrals. In October 1845, at the age of 26, he became professor of pure mathematics at the Faculty of Sciences of Lyon.

He remained there seven years, then obtained the class of special mathematics at the Bonaparte high school in Paris in October 1852. He was called to replace Joseph-Alfred Serret in the chair of calculus and integral calculus of the Faculty of Sciences of Paris during the second semester 1855-1856. In October 1858, he became professor of the special mathematics class at Lycee Louis-le-Grand, replacing Jules Vieille as inspector. He is on leave of absence in 1867-68 (supplemented by Gaston Darboux), then is appointed lecturer of descriptive geometry and differential and integral calculus at the École normale supérieure on October 31, 1868 (replacing Victor Puiseux).

Parallel to his teaching high school and the Ecole Normale Supérieure, he assumed the faculty of science during the second half of 1865. He was elected member of the Academy of Sciences in 1875. He was appointed Knight of the Legion of Honor on 13 August 1858 and Officer on 31 December 1884.

Bouquet was a respected teacher as well as researcher. It was rare for collaborative joint research papers such as those that Bouquet completed. His student, Jules Tannery, praised him highly as a teacher.
