= Abel elliptic functions =

In mathematics Abel elliptic functions are a special kind of elliptic functions, that were established by the Norwegian mathematician Niels Henrik Abel. He published his paper "Recherches sur les Fonctions elliptiques" in Crelle's Journal in 1827. It was the first work on elliptic functions that was actually published. Abel's work on elliptic functions also influenced Jacobi's studies of elliptic functions, whose 1829 published book Fundamenta nova theoriae functionum ellipticarum became the standard work on elliptic functions. They are derived from the inverse of an elliptic integral and are doubly periodic in the complex plane.

== History ==
Abel's starting point were the elliptic integrals which had been studied in great detail by Adrien-Marie Legendre. He began his research in 1823 when he still was a student. In particular he viewed them as complex functions which at that time were still in their infancy. In the following years Abel continued to explore these functions. He also tried to generalize them to functions with even more periods, but seemed to be in no hurry to publish his results.

But in the beginning of the year 1827 he wrote together his first, long presentation Recherches sur les fonctions elliptiques of his discoveries. At the end of the same year he became aware of Carl Gustav Jacobi and his works on new transformations of elliptic integrals. Abel finishes then a second part of his article on elliptic functions and shows in an appendix how the transformation results of Jacobi would easily follow. When he then sees the next publication by Jacobi where he makes use of elliptic functions to prove his results without referring to Abel, the Norwegian mathematician finds himself to be in a struggle with Jacobi over priority. He finishes several new articles about related issues, now for the first time dating them, but dies less than a year later in 1829. In the meantime Jacobi completes his great work Fundamenta nova theoriae functionum ellipticarum on elliptic functions which appears the same year as a book. It ended up defining what would be the standard form of elliptic functions in the years that followed.

== Derivation from elliptic Integrals ==
Consider the elliptic integral of the first kind in the following symmetric form:

$\alpha(x):=\int_{0}^{x}\frac{\mathrm dt}{\sqrt{(1-c^2t^2)(1+e^2t^2)}}$ with $c,e\in\mathbb{R}$.

$\alpha$ is an odd increasing function on the interval $\bigl[{-\tfrac1c},\tfrac1c\bigr]$ with the maximum:

$${\omega\over 2}:= \int_0^{1/c} \frac{dt}{\sqrt{(1 - c^2 t^2)(1 + e^2 t^2)}}.$$

That means $\alpha$ is invertible: There exists a function $\varphi$ such that $x=\varphi(\alpha(x))$, which is well-defined on the interval $\bigl[{-\tfrac\omega2},\tfrac\omega2\bigr]$.

Like the function $\alpha$, it depends on the parameters $c$ and $e$ which can be expressed by writing $\varphi(u;e,c)$.

Since $\alpha$ is an odd function, $\varphi$ is also an odd function which means $\varphi(-u)=-\varphi(u)$.

By taking the derivative with respect to $u$ one gets:

$$\varphi'(u) = \sqrt{(1 - c^2\varphi^2(u))(1 + e^2\varphi^2(u))}$$

which is an even function, i.e., $\varphi(-u)=\varphi(u)$.

Abel introduced the new functions

$$f(u) = \sqrt{1 - c^2\varphi^2(u)}, \;\;\; F(u) = \sqrt{1 + e^2\varphi^2(u)}$$.

Thereby it holds that $\varphi'(u)=f(u)F(u)$.

$\varphi$, $f$ and $F$ are the functions known as Abel elliptic functions. They can be continued using the addition theorems.

For example adding $\plusmn\tfrac12\omega$ one gets:

$\varphi\big(u \pm {\omega\over 2}\big) = \pm {1\over c}{f(u)\over F(u)}, \quad$$f\big(u \pm {\omega\over 2}\big) = \mp \sqrt{c^2 + e^2}{\varphi(u)\over F(u)}, \;\; F\big(u \pm {\omega\over 2}\big) = {\sqrt{c^2 + e^2}\over c} {1\over F(u)}$.

=== Complex extension ===
$\varphi$ can be continued onto purely imaginary numbers by introducing the substitution $t\rightarrow it$. One gets $xi=\varphi(\beta i)$, where

$$\beta(x)=\int_{0}^{x}\frac{\mathrm dt}{\sqrt{(1+c^2t^2)(1-e^2t^2)}}$$.

$\beta$ is an increasing function on the interval $\bigl[{-\tfrac1e},\tfrac1e\bigr]$ with the maximum

$$\frac{\tilde{{\omega}}}{2}:=\int_{0}^{\frac1{e}}\frac{\mathrm dt}{\sqrt{(1+c^2t^2)(1-e^2t^2)}}$$.

That means $\varphi$, $f$ and $F$ are known along the real and imaginary axes. Using the addition theorems again they can be extended onto the complex plane.

For example for $\alpha \in \bigl[{-\tfrac\omega2},\tfrac\omega2\bigr]$ yields to

$$\varphi(\alpha+\tfrac12\tilde{\omega}i)=
\frac{\varphi(\alpha)f(\tfrac12\tilde{\omega}i)F(\tfrac12\tilde{\omega}i)+\varphi(\tfrac12\tilde{\omega}i)f(\alpha)F(\alpha)}{1+c^2e^2\varphi^2(\alpha)\varphi^2(\tfrac12\tilde{\omega}i)}=
\frac{\frac{i} {e} f(\alpha)F(\alpha)}{1+c^2e^2\varphi^2(\alpha)\frac{i^2}{e^2}}=
\frac{i} {e}\frac{f(\alpha)F(\alpha)}{1- c^2\varphi^2(\alpha)}=
\frac{i} {e}\frac{f(\alpha)F(\alpha)}{f^2(\alpha)}=
\frac{i} {e} \frac{F(\alpha)}{f(\alpha)}$$.

=== Double periodicity and poles ===
The periodicity of $\varphi$, $f$ and $F$ can be shown by applying the addition theorems multiple times. All three functions are doubly periodic which means they have two $\mathbb{R}$-linear independent periods in the complex plane:

$$\varphi(\alpha+2\omega)=\varphi(\alpha)=\varphi(\alpha+2\tilde{\omega}i)=\varphi(\alpha+\omega+\tilde{\omega}i)$$

$$f(\alpha+2\omega)=f(\alpha)=f(\alpha+\tilde{\omega}i)$$

$$F(\alpha+\omega)=F(\alpha)=F(\alpha+2\tilde{\omega}i)$$.

The poles of the functions $\varphi(\alpha)$,$f(\alpha)$ and $F(\alpha)$ are at

$\alpha=(m+\tfrac12)\omega+(n+\tfrac12)\tilde{\omega i}, \quad$ for $m,n\in\mathbb{Z}$.

== Relation to Jacobi elliptic functions ==
Abel's elliptic functions can be expressed by the Jacobi elliptic functions, which do not depend on the parameters $c$ and $e$ but on a modulus $k$:

$$\varphi(u;c,e)=\frac1{c}\operatorname{sn}(cu,k)$$

$$f(u;c,e)=\operatorname{cn}(cu,k)$$
$$F(u;c,e)=\operatorname{dn}(cu,k)$$,

where $k=\frac{ie}{c}$.

== Addition Theorems ==
For the functions $\varphi$, $f$ and $F$ the following addition theorems hold:

$$\varphi(\alpha+\beta)=\frac{\varphi(\alpha)f(\beta)F(\beta)+\varphi(\beta)f(\alpha)F(\alpha)}{R}$$

$$f(\alpha+\beta)=\frac{f(\alpha)f(\beta)-c^2\varphi(\alpha)\varphi(\beta)F(\alpha)F(\beta)}{R}$$

$$F(\alpha+\beta)=\frac{F(\alpha)F(\beta)+e^2\varphi(\alpha)\varphi(\beta)f(\alpha)f(\beta)}{R}$$,

where $R=1+c^2e^2\varphi^2(\alpha)\varphi^2(\beta)$.

These follow from the addition theorems for elliptic integrals that Euler already had proven.

== Literature ==
- Niels Henrik Abel, Recherches sur le fonctions elliptiques, first and second part in Sophus Lie and Ludwig Sylow (eds.) Collected Works, Oslo (1881).
- Christian Houzel, The Work of Niels Henrik Abel, in O.A. Laudal and R. Piene, The Legacy of Niels Henrik Abel – The Abel Bicentennial, Oslo 2002, Springer Verlag, Berlin (2004). ISBN 3-540-43826-2.
