= Weierstrass elliptic function =

Class of mathematical functions

In mathematics, the Weierstrass elliptic functions are elliptic functions that take a particularly simple form. They are named for Karl Weierstrass. This class of functions is also referred to as ℘-functions and they are usually denoted by the symbol ℘, a uniquely fancy script p. They play an important role in the theory of elliptic functions, i.e., meromorphic functions that are doubly periodic. A ℘-function together with its derivative can be used to parameterize elliptic curves and they generate the field of elliptic functions with respect to a given period lattice.

Symbol for Weierstrass $\wp$-function

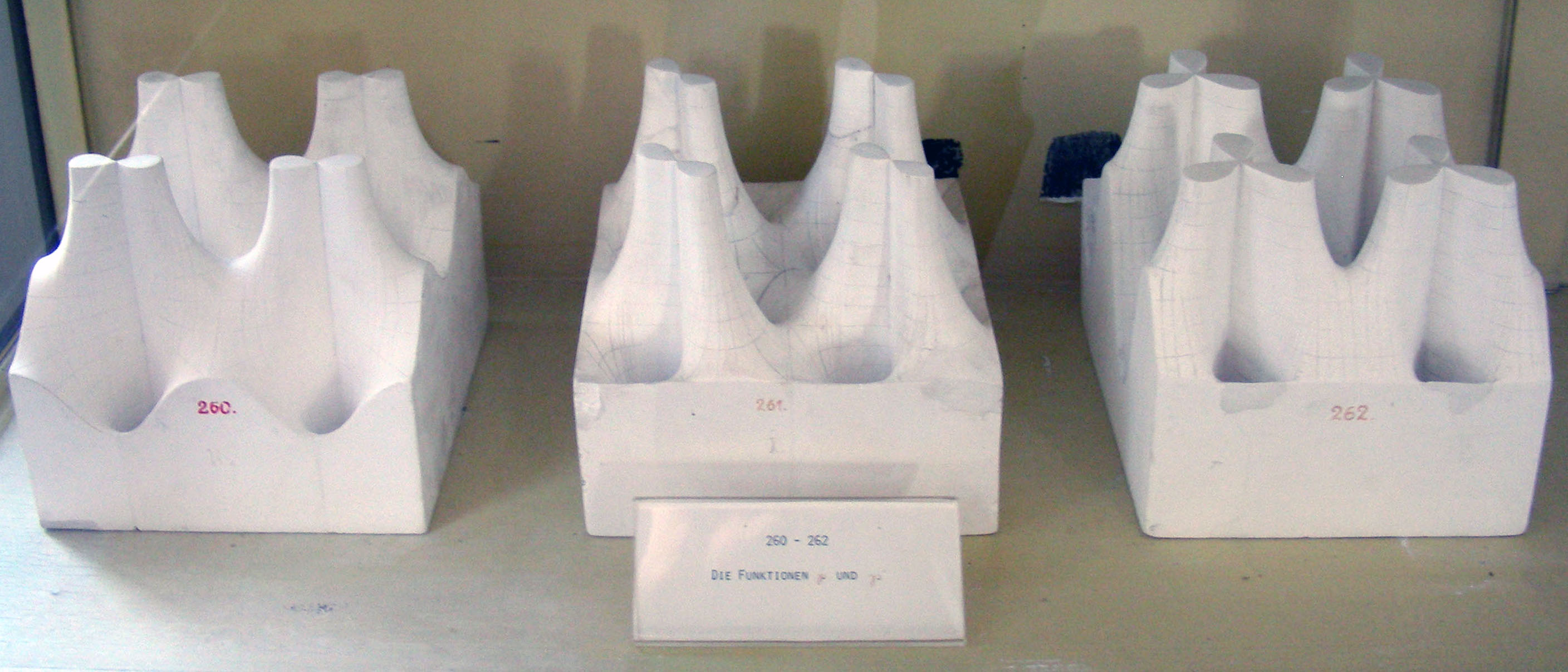
Model of Weierstrass $\wp$-function

== Motivation ==
A cubic of the form $C_{g_2,g_3}^\mathbb{C}=\{(x,y)\in\mathbb{C}^2:y^2=4x^3-g_2x-g_3\}$, where $g_2,g_3\in\mathbb{C}$ are complex numbers with $g_2^3-27g_3^2\neq0$, cannot be rationally parameterized. Yet one still wants to find a way to parameterize it.

For the quadric $K=\left\{(x,y)\in\mathbb{R}^2:x^2+y^2=1\right\}$; the unit circle, there exists a (non-rational) parameterization using the sine function and its derivative the cosine function:
$$\psi:\mathbb{R}/2\pi\mathbb{Z}\to K, \quad t\mapsto(\sin t,\cos t).$$
Because of the periodicity of the sine and cosine $\mathbb{R}/2\pi\mathbb{Z}$ is chosen to be the domain, so the function is bijective.

In a similar way one can get a parameterization of $C_{g_2,g_3}^\mathbb{C}$ by means of the doubly periodic $\wp$-function and its derivative, namely via $(x,y)=(\wp(z),\wp'(z))$. This parameterization has the domain $\mathbb{C}/\Lambda$, which is topologically equivalent to a torus.

There is another analogy to the trigonometric functions. Consider the integral function
$$a(x)=\int_0^x\frac{dy}{\sqrt{1-y^2}} .$$
It can be simplified by substituting $y=\sin t$ and $s=\arcsin x$:
$$a(x)=\int_0^s dt = s = \arcsin x .$$
That means $a^{-1}(x) = \sin x$. So the sine function is an inverse function of an integral function.

Elliptic functions are the inverse functions of elliptic integrals. In particular, let:
$$u(z)=\int_z^\infin\frac{ds}{\sqrt{4s^3-g_2s-g_3}} .$$
Then the extension of $u^{-1}$ to the complex plane equals the $\wp$-function. This invertibility is used in complex analysis to provide a solution to certain nonlinear differential equations satisfying the Painlevé property, i.e., those equations that admit poles as their only movable singularities.

== Definition ==
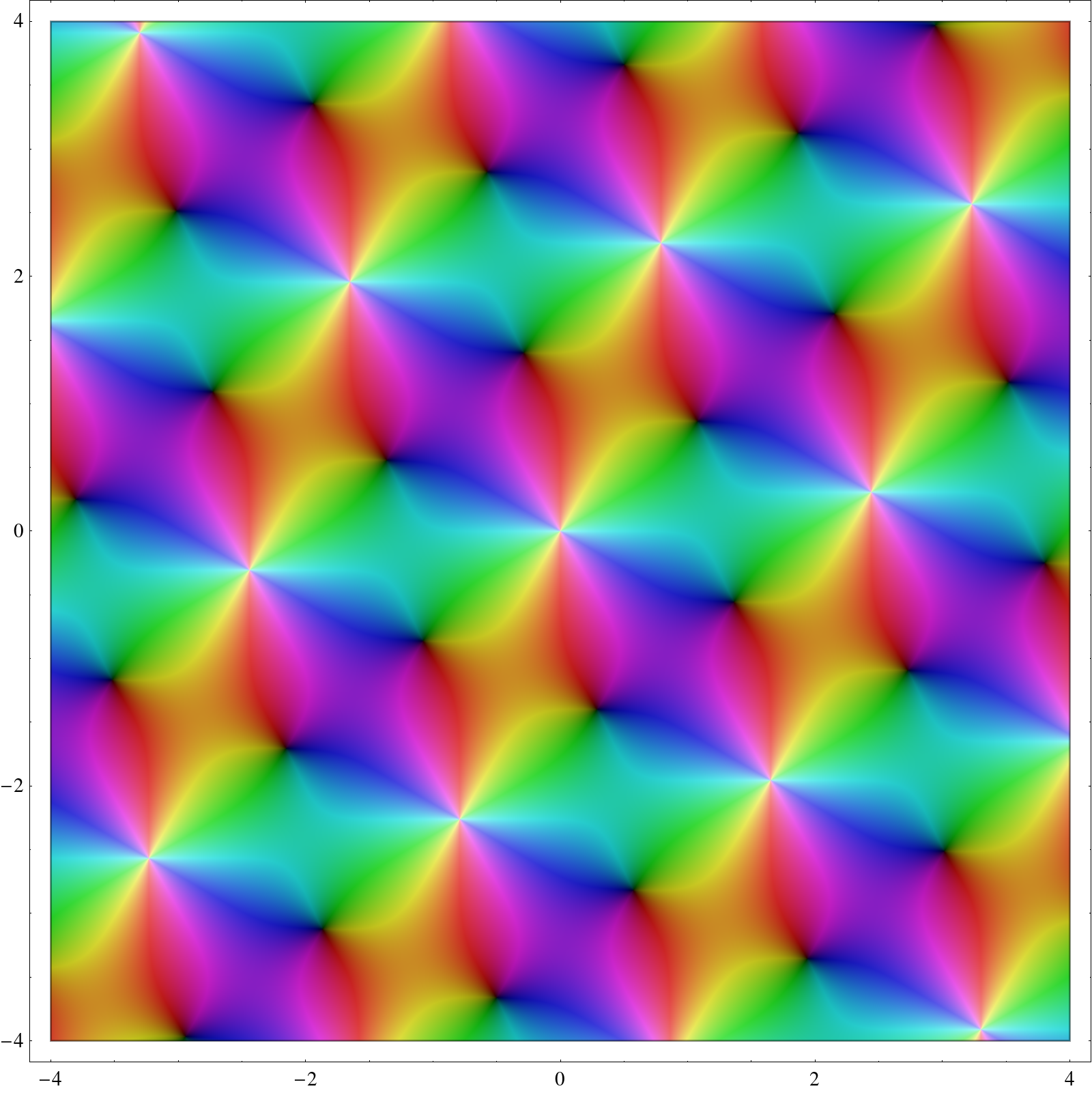
Visualization of the $\wp$-function with invariants $g_2=1+i$ and $g_3=2-3i$ in which white corresponds to a pole, black to a zero.

Let $\omega_1,\omega_2\in\mathbb{C}$ be two complex numbers that are linearly independent over $\mathbb{R}$ and let $\Lambda:=\mathbb{Z}\omega_1+\mathbb{Z}\omega_2:=\{m\omega_1+n\omega_2: m,n\in\mathbb{Z}\}$ be the period lattice generated by those numbers. Then the $\wp$-function is defined as follows:

$$\weierp(z,\omega_1,\omega_2):=\wp(z) = \frac{1}{z^2} + \sum_{\lambda\in\Lambda\setminus\{0\}}\left(\frac 1 {(z-\lambda)^2} - \frac 1 {\lambda^2}\right).$$

This series converges locally uniformly absolutely in the complex torus $\mathbb{C} / \Lambda$.

It is common to use $1$ and $\tau$ in the upper half-plane $\mathbb{H}:=\{z\in\mathbb{C}:\operatorname{Im}(z) > 0\}$ as generators of the lattice. Dividing by $\omega_1$ maps the lattice $\mathbb{Z}\omega_1+\mathbb{Z}\omega_2$ isomorphically onto the lattice $\mathbb{Z}+\mathbb{Z}\tau$ with $\tau=\tfrac{\omega_2}{\omega_1}$. Because $-\tau$ can be substituted for $\tau$, without loss of generality we can assume $\tau\in\mathbb{H}$, and then define $\wp(z,\tau) := \wp(z, 1,\tau)$. With that definition, we have $\wp(z,\omega_1,\omega_2) = \omega_1^{-2}\wp(z/\omega_1,\omega_2/\omega_1)$.

== Properties ==
- $\wp$ is a meromorphic function with a pole of order 2 at each period $\lambda$ in $\Lambda$.
- $\wp$ is a homogeneous function in that:

$$\wp(\lambda z , \lambda\omega_{1}, \lambda\omega_{2}) = \lambda^{-2} \wp (z, \omega_{1},\omega_{2}).$$

- $\wp$ is an even function. That means $\wp(z)=\wp(-z)$ for all $z \in \mathbb{C} \setminus \Lambda$, which can be seen in the following way:

$$\begin{align}
\wp(-z) & =\frac{1}{(-z)^2} + \sum_{\lambda\in\Lambda\setminus\{0\}}\left(\frac{1}{(-z-\lambda)^2}-\frac{1}{\lambda^2}\right) \\
& =\frac{1}{z^2}+\sum_{\lambda\in\Lambda\setminus\{0\}}\left(\frac{1}{(z+\lambda)^2}-\frac{1}{\lambda^2}\right) \\
& =\frac{1}{z^2}+\sum_{\lambda\in\Lambda\setminus\{0\}}\left(\frac{1}{(z-\lambda)^2}-\frac{1}{\lambda^2}\right)=\wp(z).
\end{align}$$

The second last equality holds because $\{-\lambda:\lambda \in \Lambda\}=\Lambda$. Since the sum converges absolutely this rearrangement does not change the limit.

- The derivative of $\wp$ is given by:
  $$\wp'(z)=-2\sum_{\lambda \in \Lambda}\frac1{(z-\lambda)^3}.$$
- $\wp$ and $\wp'$ are doubly periodic with the periods $\omega_1$ and $\omega_2$. This means:
  $$\begin{aligned}
\wp(z+\omega_1) &= \wp(z) = \wp(z+\omega_2),\ \textrm{and} \\[3mu]
\wp'(z+\omega_1) &= \wp'(z) = \wp'(z+\omega_2).
\end{aligned}$$
  It follows that $\wp(z+\lambda)=\wp(z)$ and $\wp'(z+\lambda)=\wp'(z)$ for all $\lambda \in \Lambda$.

== Laurent expansion ==
Let $r:=\min\{{|\lambda}|:0\neq\lambda\in\Lambda\}$. Then for $0<|z|<r$ the $\wp$-function has the following Laurent expansion
$$\wp(z)=\frac1{z^2}+\sum_{n=1}^\infin (2n+1)G_{2n+2}z^{2n}$$
where
$$G_n=\sum_{0\neq\lambda\in\Lambda}\lambda^{-n}$$
for $n \geq 3$ are so called Eisenstein series.

== Differential equation ==
Set $g_2=60G_4$ and $g_3=140G_6$. Then the $\wp$-function satisfies the differential equation
$$\wp'^2(z) = 4\wp ^3(z)-g_2\wp(z)-g_3.$$
This relation can be verified by forming a linear combination of powers of $\wp$ and $\wp'$ to eliminate the pole at $z=0$. This yields an entire elliptic function that has to be constant by Liouville's theorem.

=== Invariants ===
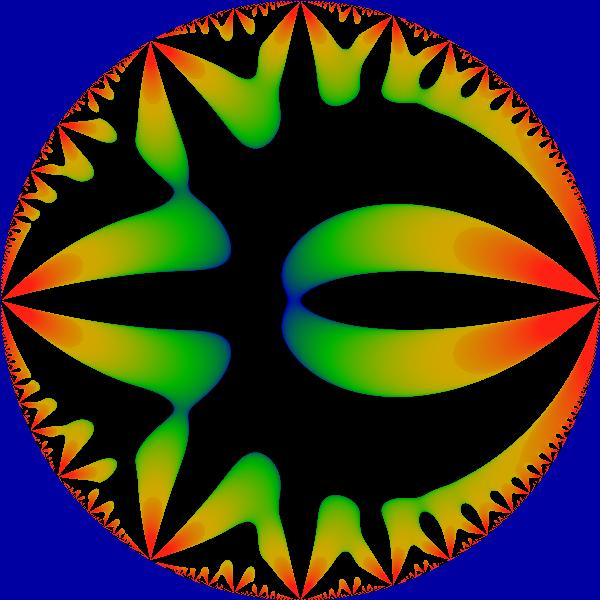
The real part of the invariant g_{3} as a function of the square of the nome q on the unit disk.

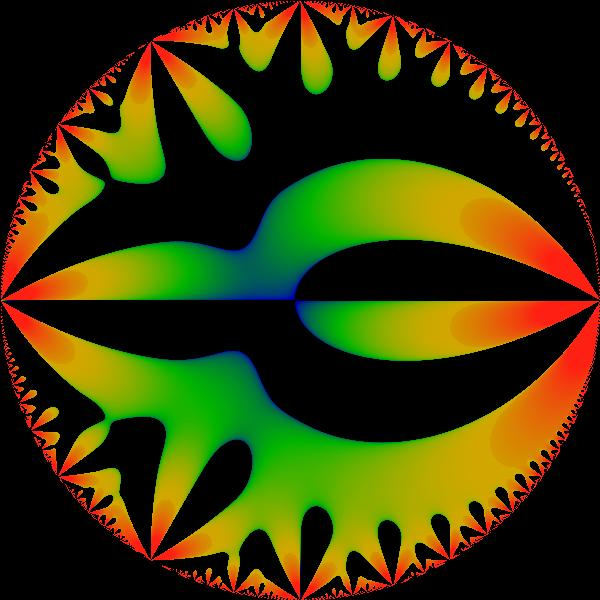
The imaginary part of the invariant g_{3} as a function of the square of the nome q on the unit disk.

The coefficients of the above differential equation $g_2$ and $g_3$ are known as the invariants. Because they depend on the lattice $\Lambda$ they can be viewed as functions in $\omega_1$ and $\omega_2$.

The series expansion suggests that $g_2$ and $g_3$ are homogeneous functions of degree $-4$ and $-6$. That is
$$g_2(\lambda \omega_1, \lambda \omega_2) = \lambda^{-4} g_2(\omega_1, \omega_2)$$
$$g_3(\lambda \omega_1, \lambda \omega_2) = \lambda^{-6} g_3(\omega_1, \omega_2)$$
for $\lambda \neq 0$.

If $\omega_1$ and $\omega_2$ are chosen in such a way that $\operatorname{Im}\left( \tfrac{\omega_2}{\omega_1} \right)>0$, $g_2$ and $g_3$ can be interpreted as functions on the upper half-plane $\mathbb{H}:=\{z\in\mathbb{C}:\operatorname{Im}(z)>0\}$.

Let $\tau=\tfrac{\omega_2}{\omega_1}$. One has:
$$g_2(1,\tau)=\omega_1^4g_2(\omega_1,\omega_2),$$
$$g_3(1,\tau)=\omega_1^6 g_3(\omega_1,\omega_2).$$
That means g_{2} and g_{3} are only scaled by doing this. Set
$$g_2(\tau):=g_2(1,\tau)$$
and
$$g_3(\tau):=g_3(1,\tau).$$
As functions of $\tau\in\mathbb{H}$, $g_2$ and $g_3$ are so called modular forms.

The Fourier series for $g_2$ and $g_3$ are given as follows:
$$g_2(\tau)=\frac43\pi^4 \left[ 1+ 240\sum_{k=1}^\infty \sigma_3(k) q^{2k} \right]$$
$$g_3(\tau)=\frac{8}{27}\pi^6 \left[ 1- 504\sum_{k=1}^\infty \sigma_5(k) q^{2k} \right]$$
where
$$\sigma_m(k):=\sum_{d\mid{k}}d^m$$
is the divisor function and $q=e^{\pi i\tau}$ is the nome.

=== Modular discriminant ===
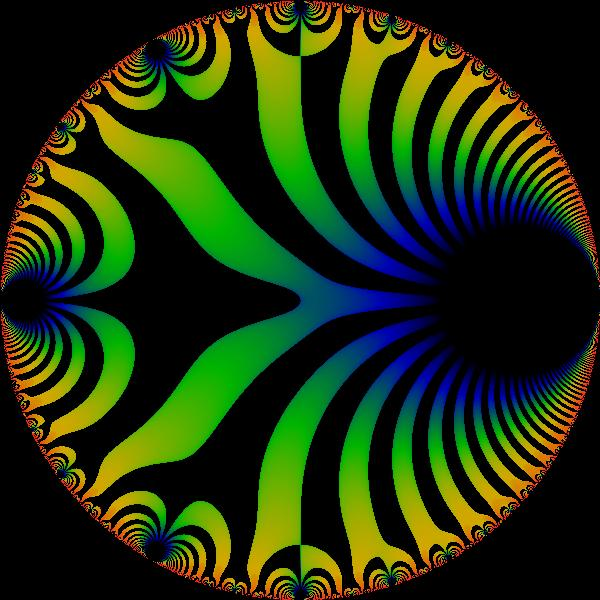
The real part of the discriminant as a function of the square of the nome q on the unit disk.

The modular discriminant $\Delta$ is defined as the discriminant of the characteristic polynomial of the differential equation
$$\wp'^2(z) = 4\wp ^3(z)-g_2\wp(z)-g_3$$
as follows:
$$\Delta=g_2^3-27g_3^2.$$
The discriminant is a modular form of weight $12$. That is, under the action of the modular group, it transforms as
$$\Delta \left( \frac {a\tau+b} {c\tau+d}\right) = \left(c\tau+d\right)^{12} \Delta(\tau)$$
where $a,b,d,c\in\mathbb{Z}$ with $ad-bc = 1$.

Note that $\Delta=(2\pi)^{12}\eta^{24}$ where $\eta$ is the Dedekind eta function.

For the Fourier coefficients of $\Delta$, see Ramanujan tau function.

=== The constants e_{1}, e_{2} and e_{3} ===
$e_1$, $e_2$ and $e_3$ are usually used to denote the values of the $\wp$-function at the half-periods.
$$e_1\equiv\wp\left(\frac{\omega_1}{2}\right)$$
$$e_2\equiv\wp\left(\frac{\omega_2}{2}\right)$$
$$e_3\equiv\wp\left(\frac{\omega_1+\omega_2}{2}\right)$$
They are pairwise distinct and only depend on the lattice $\Lambda$ and not on its generators.

$e_1$, $e_2$ and $e_3$ are the roots of the cubic polynomial $4\wp(z)^3-g_2\wp(z)-g_3$ and are related by the equation:
$$e_1+e_2+e_3=0.$$
Because those roots are distinct the discriminant $\Delta$ does not vanish on the upper half plane. Now we can rewrite the differential equation:
$$\wp'^2(z)=4(\wp(z)-e_1)(\wp(z)-e_2)(\wp(z)-e_3).$$
That means the half-periods are zeros of $\wp'$.

The invariants $g_2$ and $g_3$ can be expressed in terms of these constants in the following way:
$$g_2 = -4 (e_1 e_2 + e_1 e_3 + e_2 e_3)$$
$$g_3 = 4 e_1 e_2 e_3$$
$e_1$, $e_2$ and $e_3$ are related to the modular lambda function:
$$\lambda (\tau)=\frac{e_3-e_2}{e_1-e_2},\quad \tau=\frac{\omega_2}{\omega_1}.$$

== Relation to Jacobi's elliptic functions ==
For numerical work, it is often convenient to calculate the Weierstrass elliptic function in terms of Jacobi's elliptic functions.

The basic relations are:
$$\wp(z) = e_3 + \frac{e_1 - e_3}{\operatorname{sn}^2 w}
= e_2 + ( e_1 - e_3 ) \frac{\operatorname{dn}^2 w}{\operatorname{sn}^2 w}
= e_1 + ( e_1 - e_3 ) \frac{\operatorname{cn}^2 w}{\operatorname{sn}^2 w}$$
where $e_1,e_2$ and $e_3$ are the three roots described above and where the modulus k of the Jacobi functions equals
$$k = \sqrt\frac{e_2 - e_3}{e_1 - e_3}$$
and their argument w equals
$$w = z \sqrt{e_1 - e_3}.$$

== Relation to Jacobi's theta functions ==
The function $\wp (z,\tau)=\wp (z,1,\omega_2/\omega_1)$ can be represented by Jacobi's theta functions:
$$\wp (z,\tau)=\left(\pi \theta_2(0,q)\theta_3(0,q)\frac{\theta_4(\pi z,q)}{\theta_1(\pi z,q)}\right)^2-\frac{\pi^2}{3}\left(\theta_2^4(0,q)+\theta_3^4(0,q)\right)$$
where $q=e^{\pi i\tau}$ is the nome and $\tau$ is the period ratio $(\tau\in\mathbb{H})$. This also provides a very rapid algorithm for computing $\wp (z,\tau)$.

== Relation to elliptic curves ==
Consider the embedding of the cubic curve in the complex projective plane

$$\bar C_{g_2,g_3}^\mathbb{C} = \{(x,y)\in\mathbb{C}^2:y^2=4x^3-g_2x-g_3\}\cup\{O\}\subset \mathbb{C}^{2} \cup \mathbb{P}_1(\mathbb{C}) =  \mathbb{P}_2(\mathbb{C}).$$

where $O$ is a point lying on the line at infinity $\mathbb{P}_1(\mathbb{C})$. For this cubic there exists no rational parameterization, if $\Delta \neq 0$. In this case it is also called an elliptic curve. Nevertheless there is a parameterization in homogeneous coordinates that uses the $\wp$-function and its derivative $\wp'$:

$$\varphi(\wp,\wp'): \mathbb{C}/\Lambda\to\bar C_{g_2,g_3}^\mathbb{C}, \quad
z \mapsto \begin{cases}
\left[\wp(z):\wp'(z):1\right] & z \notin \Lambda \\
\left[0:1:0\right] \quad & z \in \Lambda
\end{cases}$$

Now the map $\varphi$ is bijective and parameterizes the elliptic curve $\bar C_{g_2,g_3}^\mathbb{C}$.

$\mathbb{C}/\Lambda$ is an abelian group and a topological space, equipped with the quotient topology.

It can be shown that every Weierstrass cubic is given in such a way. That is to say that for every pair $g_2,g_3\in\mathbb{C}$ with $\Delta = g_2^3 - 27g_3^2 \neq 0$ there exists a lattice $\mathbb{Z}\omega_1+\mathbb{Z}\omega_2$, such that

$g_2=g_2(\omega_1,\omega_2)$ and $g_3=g_3(\omega_1,\omega_2)$.

== Addition theorem ==
The addition theorem states that if $z,w,$ and $z+w$ do not belong to $\Lambda$, then
$$\det\begin{bmatrix}1 & \wp(z) & \wp'(z) \\ 1 & \wp(w) & \wp'(w) \\ 1 & \wp(z+w) & -\wp'(z+w)\end{bmatrix}=0.$$
This states that the points $P=(\wp(z),\wp'(z)),$ $Q=(\wp(w),\wp'(w)),$ and $R=(\wp(z+w),-\wp'(z+w))$ are collinear, the geometric form of the group law of an elliptic curve.

This can be proven by considering constants $A,B$ such that
$$\wp'(z) = A\wp(z) + B, \quad \wp'(w) = A\wp(w) + B.$$
Then the elliptic function
$$\wp'(\zeta) - A\wp(\zeta) - B$$
has a pole of order three at zero, and therefore three zeros whose sum belongs to $\Lambda$. Two of the zeros are $z$ and $w$, and thus the third is congruent to $-z-w$.

=== Alternative form ===
The addition theorem can be put into the alternative form, for $z,w,z-w,z+w\not\in\Lambda$:
$$\wp(z+w)=\frac14 \left[\frac{\wp'(z)-\wp'(w)}{\wp(z)-\wp(w)}\right]^2-\wp(z)-\wp(w).$$

As well as the duplication formula:
$$\wp(2z)=\frac14\left[\frac{\wp''(z)}{\wp'(z)}\right]^2-2\wp(z).$$

==== Proofs ====
This can be proven from the addition theorem shown above. The points $P=(\wp(u),\wp'(u)), Q=(\wp(v),\wp'(v)),$ and $R=(\wp(u+v),-\wp'(u+v))$ are collinear and lie on the curve $y^2=4x^3-g_2x-g_3$. The slope of that line is
$$m=\frac{y_P-y_Q}{x_P-x_Q}=\frac{\wp'(u)-\wp'(v)}{\wp(u)-\wp(v)}.$$
So $x=x_P=\wp(u)$, $x=x_Q=\wp(v)$, and $x=x_R=\wp(u+v)$ all satisfy a cubic
$$(mx+q)^2=4x^3-g_2x-g_3,$$
where $q$ is a constant. This becomes
$$4x^3-m^2x^2-(2mq+g_2)x-g_3-q^2=0.$$
Thus $x_P+x_Q+x_R=\frac{m^2}4$ which provides the wanted formula $\wp(u+v)+\wp(u)+\wp(v)=\frac14 \left[ \frac{\wp'(u)-\wp'(v)}{\wp(u)-\wp(v)} \right]^2.$

A direct proof is as follows. Any elliptic function $f$ can be expressed as:
$$f(u)=c\prod_{i=1}^n \frac{\sigma(u-a_i)}{\sigma(u-b_i)} \quad c \in \mathbb{C}$$
where $\sigma$ is the Weierstrass sigma function and $a_i , b_i$ are the respective zeros and poles in the period parallelogram. Considering the function $\wp(u)-\wp(v)$ as a function of $u$, we have
$$\wp(u)-\wp(v)=c\frac{\sigma(u+v)\sigma(u-v)}{\sigma(u)^2}.$$
Multiplying both sides by $u^2$ and letting $u\to 0$, we have $1 = -c\sigma(v)^2$, so $c=-\frac1{\sigma(v)^2} \implies\wp(u)-\wp(v)=-\frac{\sigma(u+v)\sigma(u-v)}{\sigma(u)^2\sigma(v)^2}.$

By definition the Weierstrass zeta function: $\frac{d}{dz}\ln \sigma(z)=\zeta(z)$ therefore we logarithmically differentiate both sides with respect to $u$ obtaining:
$$\frac{\wp'(u)}{\wp(u)-\wp(v)}=\zeta(u+v)-2\zeta(u)-\zeta(u-v)$$
Once again by definition $\zeta'(z)=-\wp(z)$ thus by differentiating once more on both sides and rearranging the terms we obtain
$$-\wp(u+v)=-\wp(u)+\frac12 \frac{ \wp''(v)[\wp(u)-\wp(v) ]-\wp'(u)[\wp'(u)-\wp'(v)] }{ [\wp(u)-\wp(v) ]^2 }$$
Knowing that $\wp''$ has the following differential equation $2\wp''=12\wp^2-g_2$ and rearranging the terms one gets the wanted formula
$$\wp(u+v)=\frac14 \left[\frac{\wp'(u)-\wp'(v)}{\wp(u)-\wp(v)}\right]^2-\wp(u)-\wp(v).$$

== Typography ==
The Weierstrass's elliptic function is usually written with a rather special, lower case script letter ℘, which was Weierstrass's own notation introduced in his lectures of 1862–1863. (Note: This symbol was also used in the version of Weierstrass's lectures published by Schwarz in the 1880s. The first edition of A Course of Modern Analysis by E. T. Whittaker in 1902 also used it.) It should not be confused with the normal mathematical script letters P: 𝒫 and 𝓅.

In computing, the letter ℘ is available as \wp in TeX. In Unicode the code point is U+2118 ℘ SCRIPT CAPITAL P, with the more correct alias weierstrass elliptic function. (Note: The Unicode Consortium has acknowledged two problems with the letter's name: the letter is in fact lowercase, and it is not a "script" class letter, like U+1D4C5 𝓅 MATHEMATICAL SCRIPT SMALL P, but the letter for Weierstrass's elliptic function. Unicode added the alias as a correction.) In HTML, it can be escaped as &weierp; or &wp;.

Character information
Preview	℘	
Unicode name	SCRIPT CAPITAL P / WEIERSTRASS ELLIPTIC FUNCTION	
Encodings	decimal	hex
Unicode	8472	U+2118
UTF-8	226 132 152	E2 84 98
Numeric character reference	&#8472;	&#x2118;
Named character reference	&weierp;, &wp;	

== See also ==
- Weierstrass sigma, zeta, and eta functions
- Jacobi elliptic functions
- Lemniscate elliptic functions
