= Elliptic function =

Class of periodic mathematical functions

In the mathematical field of complex analysis, elliptic functions are special kinds of meromorphic functions, that satisfy two periodicity conditions. They are named elliptic functions because they come from elliptic integrals. Those integrals are in turn named elliptic because they first were encountered for the calculation of the arc length of an ellipse.

Important elliptic functions are Jacobi elliptic functions and the Weierstrass $\wp$-function.

Further development of this theory led to hyperelliptic functions and modular forms.

== Definition ==
A meromorphic function is called an elliptic function, if there are two $\mathbb{R}$-linear independent complex numbers $\omega_1,\omega_2 \in \mathbb{C}$ such that

$$f(z + \omega_1) = f(z) \text{ and } f(z + \omega_2) = f(z), \quad \forall z\in\mathbb{C}.$$

So elliptic functions have two periods and are therefore doubly periodic functions.

== Period lattice and fundamental domain ==
The fundamental domain of an elliptic function as the unit cell of its period lattice.

Parallelogram where opposite sides are identified

If $f$ is an elliptic function with periods $\omega_1, \omega_2$ it also holds that

$$f(z+\gamma) = f(z)$$

for every linear combination $\gamma=m\omega_1+n\omega_2$ with $m,n\in\mathbb{Z}$.

The abelian group

$$\Lambda:=\langle \omega_1,\omega_2\rangle_{\mathbb Z}:=\mathbb Z\omega_1+\mathbb Z\omega_2:=\{m\omega_1+n\omega_2\mid m,n\in\mathbb Z\}$$

is called the period lattice.

The parallelogram generated by $\omega_1$and $\omega_2$

$$\{\mu\omega_1+\nu\omega_2\mid 0\leq\mu,\nu\leq 1\}$$

is a fundamental domain of $\Lambda$ acting on $\Complex$.

Geometrically the complex plane is tiled with parallelograms. Everything that happens in one fundamental domain repeats in all the others. For that reason we can view elliptic function as functions with the quotient group $\mathbb{C}/\Lambda$ as their domain. This quotient group, called an elliptic curve, can be visualised as a parallelogram where opposite sides are identified, which topologically is a torus.

== Liouville's theorems ==
The following three theorems are known as Liouville's theorems (1847).

=== 1st theorem ===
A holomorphic elliptic function is constant.

This is the original form of Liouville's theorem and can be derived from it. A holomorphic elliptic function is bounded since it takes on all of its values on the fundamental domain which is compact. So it is constant by Liouville's theorem.

=== 2nd theorem ===
Every elliptic function has finitely many poles in $\mathbb{C}/\Lambda$ and the sum of its residues is zero.

This theorem implies that there is no elliptic function not equal to zero with exactly one pole of order one or exactly one zero of order one in the fundamental domain.

=== 3rd theorem ===
A non-constant elliptic function takes on every value the same number of times in $\mathbb{C}/\Lambda$ counted with multiplicity.

== Weierstrass ℘-function ==
One of the most important elliptic functions is the Weierstrass $\wp$-function. For a given period lattice $\Lambda$ it is defined by

$$\wp(z)=\frac1{z^2}+\sum_{\lambda\in\Lambda\setminus\{0\}}\left(\frac1{(z-\lambda)^2}-\frac1{\lambda^2}\right).$$

It is constructed in such a way that it has a pole of order two at every lattice point. The term $-\frac1{\lambda^2}$ is there to make the series convergent.

$\wp$ is an even elliptic function; that is, $\wp(-z)=\wp(z)$.

Its derivative

$$\wp'(z)=-2\sum_{\lambda\in\Lambda}\frac1{(z-\lambda)^3}$$

is an odd function, i.e. $\wp'(-z)=-\wp'(z).$

One of the main results of the theory of elliptic functions is the following: Every elliptic function with respect to a given period lattice $\Lambda$ can be expressed as a rational function in terms of $\wp$ and $\wp'$.

The $\wp$-function satisfies the differential equation

$$\wp'(z)^2=4\wp(z)^3-g_2\wp(z)-g_3,$$

where $g_2$ and $g_3$ are constants that depend on $\Lambda$. More precisely, $g_2(\omega_1,\omega_2) = 60G_4(\omega_1,\omega_2)$ and $g_3(\omega_1,\omega_2) = 140G_6(\omega_1,\omega_2)$, where $G_4$ and $G_6$ are so called Eisenstein series.

In algebraic language, the field of elliptic functions is isomorphic to the field

$$\mathbb C(X)[Y]/(Y^2-4X^3+g_2X+g_3),$$

where the isomorphism maps $\wp$ to $X$ and $\wp'$ to $Y$.

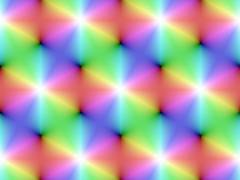
Weierstrass $\wp$-function with period lattice $\Lambda = \mathbb{Z}+e^{2\pi i/6}\mathbb{Z}$

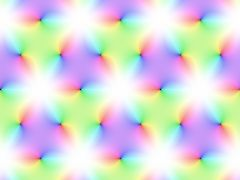
Derivative of the $\wp$-function

== Relation to elliptic integrals ==
The relation to elliptic integrals has mainly a historical background. Elliptic integrals had been studied by Legendre, whose work was taken on by Niels Henrik Abel and Carl Gustav Jacobi.

Abel discovered elliptic functions by taking the inverse function $\varphi$ of the elliptic integral function

$$\alpha(x)=\int_0^x \frac{dt}{\sqrt{(1-c^2t^2)(1+e^2t^2)}}$$

with $x=\varphi(\alpha)$.

Additionally he defined the functions

$$f(\alpha)=\sqrt{1-c^2\varphi^2(\alpha)}$$

and

$$F(\alpha)=\sqrt{1+e^2\varphi^2(\alpha)}.$$

After continuation to the complex plane they turned out to be doubly periodic and are known as Abel elliptic functions.

Jacobi elliptic functions are similarly obtained as inverse functions of elliptic integrals.

Jacobi considered the integral function

$$\xi(x)=\int_0^x \frac{dt}{\sqrt{(1-t^2)(1-k^2t^2)}}$$

and inverted it: $x=\operatorname{sn}(\xi)$. $\operatorname{sn}$ stands for sinus amplitudinis and is the name of the new function. He then introduced the functions cosinus amplitudinis and delta amplitudinis, which are defined as follows:

$$\operatorname{cn}(\xi) := \sqrt{1-x^2}$$
$$\operatorname{dn}(\xi) := \sqrt{1-k^2x^2}.$$

Only by taking this step, Jacobi could prove his general transformation formula of elliptic integrals in 1827.

== History ==
Shortly after the development of infinitesimal calculus the theory of elliptic functions was started by the Italian mathematician Giulio di Fagnano and the Swiss mathematician Leonhard Euler. When they tried to calculate the arc length of a lemniscate they encountered problems involving integrals that contained the square root of polynomials of degree 3 and 4. It was clear that those so called elliptic integrals could not be solved using elementary functions. Fagnano observed an algebraic relation between elliptic integrals, which he published in 1750. Euler immediately generalized Fagnano's results and posed his algebraic addition theorem for elliptic integrals.

Except for a comment by Landen his ideas were not pursued until 1786, when Legendre published his paper Mémoires sur les intégrations par arcs d’ellipse. Legendre subsequently studied elliptic integrals and called them elliptic functions. Legendre introduced a three-fold classification – three kinds – which was a crucial simplification of the rather complicated theory at that time. Other important works of Legendre are: Mémoire sur les transcendantes elliptiques (1792), Exercices de calcul intégral (1811–1817), Traité des fonctions elliptiques (1825–1832). Legendre's work was mostly left untouched by mathematicians until 1826.

Subsequently, Niels Henrik Abel and Carl Gustav Jacobi resumed the investigations and quickly discovered new results. At first they inverted the elliptic integral function. Following a suggestion of Jacobi in 1829 these inverse functions are now called elliptic functions. One of Jacobi's most important works is Fundamenta nova theoriae functionum ellipticarum which was published 1829. The addition theorem Euler found was posed and proved in its general form by Abel in 1829. In those days the theory of elliptic functions and the theory of doubly periodic functions were considered to be different theories. They were brought together by Briot and Bouquet in 1856. Gauss discovered many of the properties of elliptic functions 30 years earlier but never published anything on the subject.

== See also ==
- Elliptic integral
- Elliptic curve
- Modular group
- Theta function

== Literature ==
- Abramowitz, Milton; Stegun, Irene Ann, eds. (1983) [June 1964]. "Chapter 16". Handbook of Mathematical Functions with Formulas, Graphs, and Mathematical Tables. Applied Mathematics Series. Vol. 55 (Ninth reprint with additional corrections of tenth original printing with corrections (December 1972); first ed.). Washington D.C.; New York: United States Department of Commerce, National Bureau of Standards; Dover Publications. pp. 567, 627. ISBN 978-0-486-61272-0. LCCN 64-60036. MR 0167642. LCCN 65-12253. See also chapter 18. (only considers the case of real invariants).
- N. I. Akhiezer, Elements of the Theory of Elliptic Functions, (1970) Moscow, translated into English as AMS Translations of Mathematical Monographs Volume 79 (1990) AMS, Rhode Island ISBN 0-8218-4532-2
- Tom M. Apostol, Modular Functions and Dirichlet Series in Number Theory, Springer-Verlag, New York, 1976. ISBN 0-387-97127-0 (See Chapter 1.)
- E. T. Whittaker and G. N. Watson. A course of modern analysis, Cambridge University Press, 1952
