= Elliptic Gauss sum =

Gauss sum on an elliptic curve

In mathematics, an elliptic Gauss sum is an analog of a Gauss sum depending on an elliptic curve with complex multiplication. The quadratic residue symbol in a Gauss sum is replaced by a higher residue symbol such as a cubic or quartic residue symbol, and the exponential function in a Gauss sum is replaced by an elliptic function. They were introduced by Eisenstein (1850), at least in the lemniscate case when the elliptic curve has complex multiplication by i, but seem to have been forgotten or ignored until the paper (Pinch 1988).

== Example ==
(Lemmermeyer 2000, 9.3) gives the following example of an elliptic Gauss sum, for the case of an elliptic curve with complex multiplication by i.

$$-\sum_t\chi(t)\varphi\left ( \frac{t}{\pi} \right )^\frac{p-1}{m}$$

where

- The sum is over residues mod P whose representatives are Gaussian integers
- n is a positive integer
- m is a positive integer dividing 4n
- p = 4n + 1 is a rational prime congruent to 1 mod 4
- φ(z) = sl((1 – i)ωz) where sl is the sine lemniscate function, an elliptic function.
- χ is the mth power residue symbol in K with respect to the prime P of K
- K is the field k[ζ]
- k is the field $\mathbb{Q}[i]$
- ζ is a primitive 4nth root of 1
- π is a primary prime in the Gaussian integers $\mathbb{Z}[i]$ with norm p
- P is a prime in the ring of integers of K lying above π with inertia degree 1
