= Lemniscate elliptic functions =

Mathematical functions

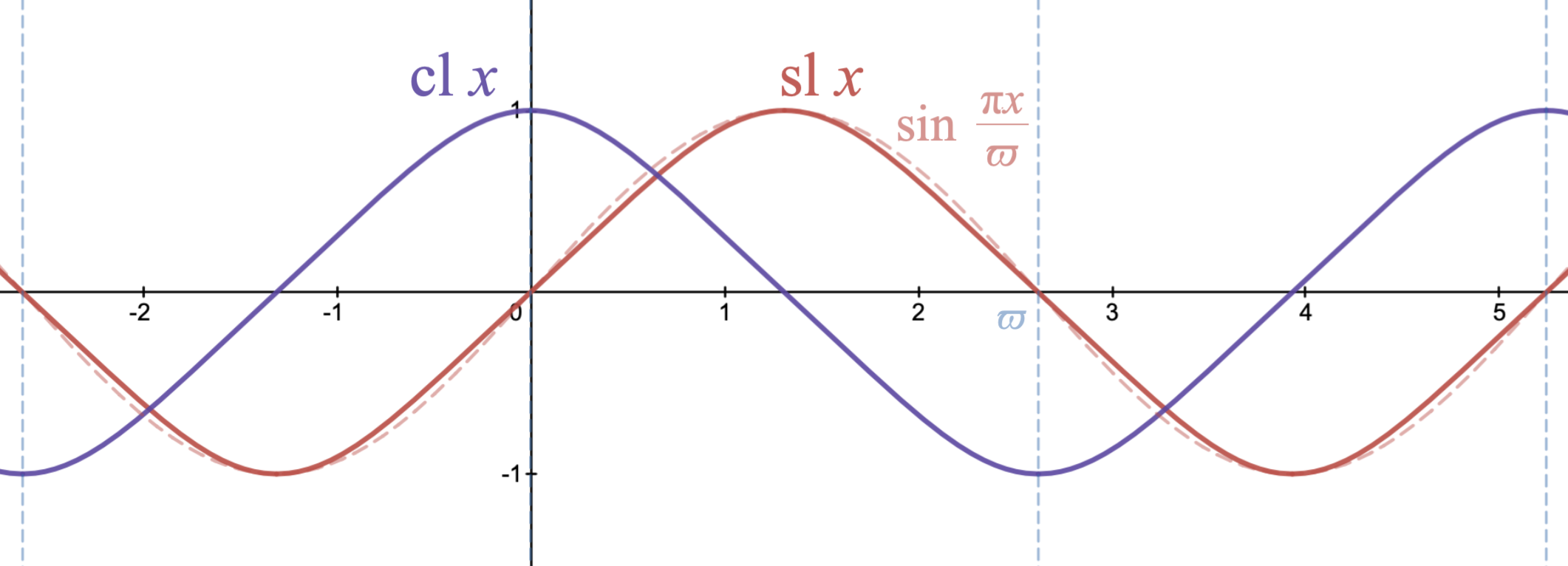
The lemniscate sine (red) and lemniscate cosine (purple) applied to a real argument, in comparison with the trigonometric sine y = sin(πx/ϖ) (pale dashed red).

In mathematics, the lemniscate elliptic functions are elliptic functions related to the arc length of the lemniscate of Bernoulli. They were first studied by Giulio Fagnano in 1718 and later by Leonhard Euler and Carl Friedrich Gauss, among others.

The lemniscate sine and lemniscate cosine functions, usually written with the symbols sl and cl (sometimes the symbols sinlem and coslem or sin lemn and cos lemn are used instead), are analogous to the trigonometric functions sine and cosine. While the trigonometric sine relates the arc length to the chord length in a unit-diameter circle $x^2+y^2 = x,$ the lemniscate sine relates the arc length to the chord length of a lemniscate $\bigl(x^2+y^2\bigr){}^2=x^2-y^2.$

The lemniscate functions have periods related to a number $\varpi =$ 2.622057... called the lemniscate constant, the ratio of a lemniscate's perimeter to its diameter. This number is a quartic analog of the (quadratic) $\pi =$ 3.141592..., ratio of perimeter to diameter of a circle.

As complex functions, sl and cl have a square period lattice (a multiple of the Gaussian integers) with fundamental periods $\{(1 + i)\varpi, (1 - i)\varpi\},$ and are a special case of two Jacobi elliptic functions on that lattice, $\operatorname{sl} z = \operatorname{sn}(z; -1),$ $\operatorname{cl} z = \operatorname{cd}(z; -1)$.

Similarly, the hyperbolic lemniscate sine slh and hyperbolic lemniscate cosine clh have a square period lattice with fundamental periods $\bigl\{\sqrt2\varpi, \sqrt2\varpi i\bigr\}.$

The lemniscate functions and the hyperbolic lemniscate functions are related to the Weierstrass elliptic function $\wp (z;a,0)$.

== Lemniscate sine and cosine functions ==
=== Definitions ===
The lemniscate functions sl and cl can be defined as the solution to the initial value problem:
$$\frac{\mathrm{d}}{\mathrm{d}z} \operatorname{sl} z = \bigl(1 + \operatorname{sl}^2 z\bigr)\operatorname{cl}z,\ \frac{\mathrm{d}}{\mathrm{d}z} \operatorname{cl} z = -\bigl(1 + \operatorname{cl}^2 z\bigr)\operatorname{sl}z,\ \operatorname{sl} 0 = 0,\  \operatorname{cl} 0 = 1,$$
or equivalently as the inverses of an elliptic integral, the Schwarz–Christoffel map from the complex unit disk to a square with corners $\big\{\tfrac12\varpi, \tfrac12\varpi i, -\tfrac12\varpi, -\tfrac12\varpi i\big\}\colon$
$$z = \int_0^{\operatorname{sl} z}\frac{\mathrm{d}t}{\sqrt{1-t^4}} = \int_{\operatorname{cl} z}^1\frac{\mathrm{d}t}{\sqrt{1-t^4}}.$$

Beyond that square, the functions can be extended to the complex plane via analytic continuation by successive reflections.

By comparison, the circular sine and cosine can be defined as the solution to the initial value problem:
$$\frac{\mathrm{d}}{\mathrm{d}z} \sin z = \cos z,\ \frac{\mathrm{d}}{\mathrm{d}z} \cos z = -\sin z,\ \sin 0 = 0,\ \cos 0 = 1,$$
or as inverses of a map from the upper half-plane to a half-infinite strip with real part between $-\tfrac12\pi, \tfrac12\pi$ and positive imaginary part:
$$z = \int_0^{\sin z}\frac{\mathrm{d}t}{\sqrt{1-t^2}} = \int_{\cos z}^1\frac{\mathrm{d}t}{\sqrt{1-t^2}}.$$

=== Relation to the lemniscate constant ===
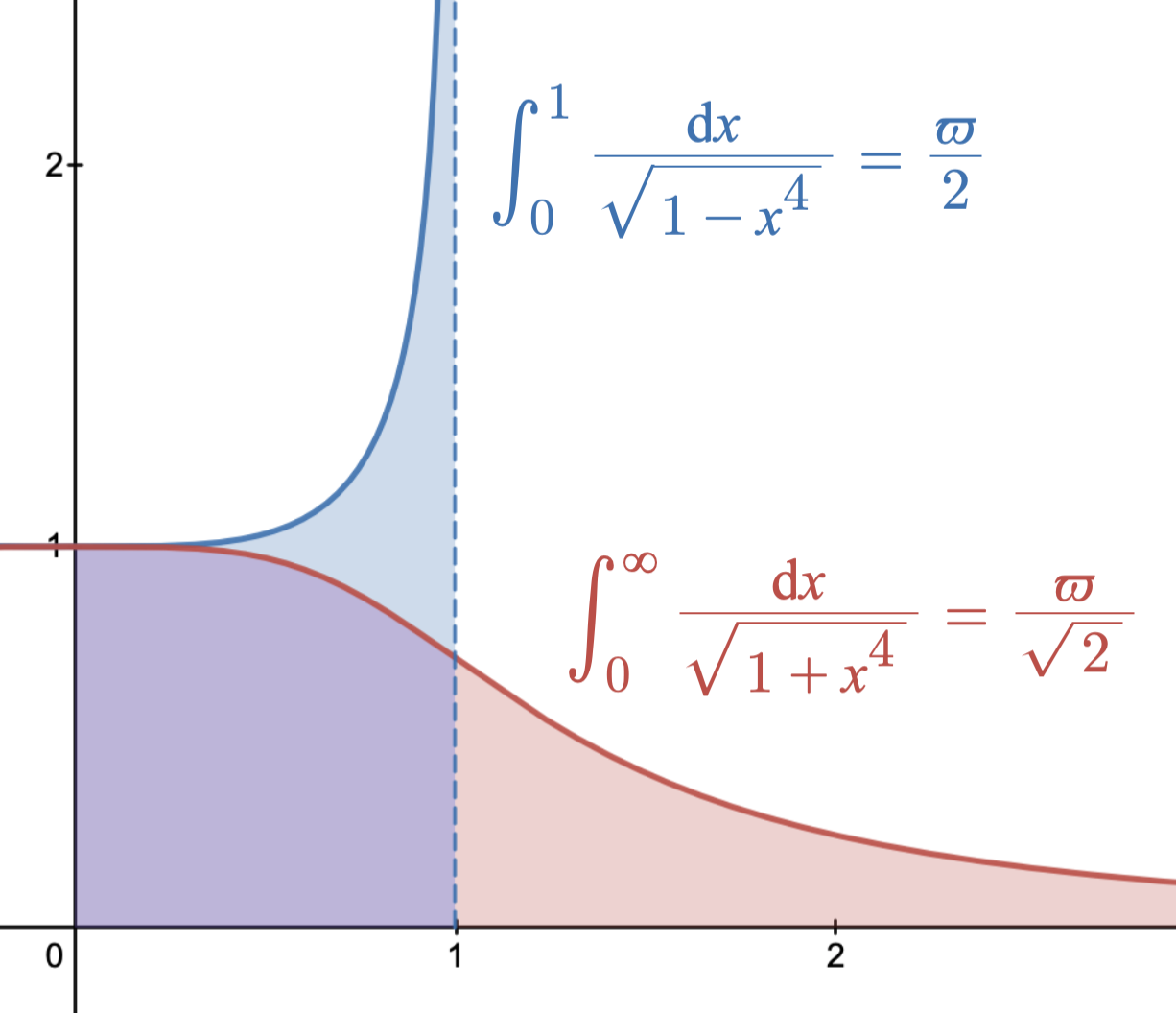
The lemniscate sine function and hyperbolic lemniscate sine functions are defined as inverses of elliptic integrals. The complete integrals are related to the lemniscate constant ϖ.

The lemniscate functions have minimal real period $2\varpi$, minimal imaginary period $2\varpi i$ and fundamental complex periods $(1+i)\varpi$ and $(1-i)\varpi$ for a constant $\varpi$ called the lemniscate constant,
$$\varpi = 2\int_0^1\frac{\mathrm{d}t}{\sqrt{1-t^4}} = \frac{\sqrt{2}\pi^{\frac{3}{2}}}{2\left(\Gamma\left(\frac{3}{4}\right)\right)^2} = 2.62205\ldots$$

The lemniscate functions satisfy the basic relation $\operatorname{cl}z = {\operatorname{sl}}\bigl(\tfrac12\varpi - z\bigr),$ analogous to the relation $\cos z = {\sin}\bigl(\tfrac12\pi - z\bigr).$

The lemniscate constant $\varpi$ is a close analog of the circle constant $\pi$, and many identities involving $\pi$ have analogues involving $\varpi$, as identities involving the trigonometric functions have analogues involving the lemniscate functions. For example, Viète's formula for $\pi$ can be written:
$$\frac2\pi = \sqrt\frac12 \cdot \sqrt{\frac12 + \frac12\sqrt\frac12} \cdot \sqrt{\frac12 + \frac12\sqrt{\frac12 + \frac12\sqrt\frac12}} \cdots$$

An analogous formula for $\varpi$ is:
$$\frac2\varpi = \sqrt\frac12 \cdot \sqrt{\frac12 +  \frac12 \bigg/ \!\sqrt\frac12} \cdot \sqrt{\frac12 +  \frac12 \Bigg/ \!\sqrt{\frac12 +  \frac12 \bigg/ \!\sqrt\frac12}} \cdots$$

The Machin formula for $\pi$ is $\tfrac14\pi = 4 \arctan \tfrac15 - \arctan \tfrac1{239},$ and several similar formulas for $\pi$ can be developed using trigonometric angle sum identities, e.g. Euler's formula $\tfrac14\pi = \arctan\tfrac12 + \arctan\tfrac13$. Analogous formulas can be developed for $\varpi$, including the following found by Gauss: $\tfrac12\varpi = 2 \operatorname{arcsl} \tfrac12 + \operatorname{arcsl} \tfrac7{23}.$

The lemniscate and circle constants were found by Gauss to be related to each-other by the arithmetic-geometric mean $M$:
$$\frac\pi\varpi = M{\left(1, \sqrt2\!~\right)}$$

== Argument identities ==
=== Zeros, poles and symmetries ===
sl in the complex plane. In the picture, it can be seen that the fundamental periods (1 + i) ϖ and (1 − i) ϖ are "minimal" in the sense that they have the smallest absolute value of all periods whose real part is non-negative.

The lemniscate functions cl and sl are even and odd functions, respectively,
$$\begin{aligned}
\operatorname{cl}(-z) &= \operatorname{cl} z \\[6mu]
\operatorname{sl}(-z) &= - \operatorname{sl} z
\end{aligned}$$

At translations of $\tfrac12\varpi,$ cl and sl are exchanged, and at translations of $\tfrac12i\varpi$ they are additionally rotated and reciprocated:
$$\begin{aligned}
{\operatorname{cl}}\bigl(z \pm \tfrac12\varpi\bigr) &= \mp\operatorname{sl} z,&
{\operatorname{cl}}\bigl(z \pm \tfrac12i\varpi\bigr) &= \frac{\mp i}{\operatorname{sl} z} \\[6mu]
{\operatorname{sl}}\bigl(z \pm \tfrac12\varpi\bigr) &= \pm\operatorname{cl} z,&
{\operatorname{sl}}\bigl(z \pm \tfrac12i\varpi\bigr) &= \frac{\pm i}{\operatorname{cl} z}
\end{aligned}$$

Doubling these to translations by a unit-Gaussian-integer multiple of $\varpi$ (that is, $\pm \varpi$ or $\pm i\varpi$), negates each function, an involution:
$$\begin{aligned}
\operatorname{cl} (z + \varpi) &= \operatorname{cl} (z + i\varpi) = -\operatorname{cl} z \\[4mu]
\operatorname{sl} (z + \varpi) &= \operatorname{sl} (z + i\varpi) = -\operatorname{sl} z
\end{aligned}$$

As a result, both functions are invariant under translation by an even-Gaussian-integer multiple of $\varpi$. That is, a displacement $(a + bi)\varpi,$ with $a + b = 2k$ for integers $a$, $b$, and $k$.
$$\begin{aligned}
{\operatorname{cl}}\bigl(z + (1 + i)\varpi\bigr) &= {\operatorname{cl}} \bigl(z + (1 - i)\varpi\bigr) = \operatorname{cl} z \\[4mu]
{\operatorname{sl}}\bigl(z + (1 + i)\varpi\bigr) &= {\operatorname{sl}} \bigl(z + (1 - i)\varpi\bigr) = \operatorname{sl} z
\end{aligned}$$

This makes them elliptic functions (doubly periodic meromorphic functions in the complex plane) with a diagonal square period lattice of fundamental periods $(1 + i)\varpi$ and $(1 - i)\varpi$. Elliptic functions with a square period lattice are more symmetrical than arbitrary elliptic functions, following the symmetries of the square.

Reflections and quarter-turn rotations of lemniscate function arguments have simple expressions:
$$\begin{aligned}
\operatorname{cl} \bar{z} &= \overline{\operatorname{cl} z} \\[6mu]
\operatorname{sl} \bar{z} &= \overline{\operatorname{sl} z} \\[4mu]
\operatorname{cl} iz &= \frac{1}{\operatorname{cl} z} \\[6mu]
\operatorname{sl} iz &= i \operatorname{sl} z
\end{aligned}$$

The sl function has simple zeros at Gaussian integer multiples of $\varpi$, complex numbers of the form $a\varpi + b\varpi i$ for integers $a$ and $b$. It has simple poles at Gaussian half-integer multiples of $\varpi$, complex numbers of the form $\bigl(a + \tfrac12\bigr)\varpi + \bigl(b + \tfrac12\bigr)\varpi i$, with residues $(-1)^{a-b+1}i$. The cl function is reflected and offset from the sl function, $\operatorname{cl}z = {\operatorname{sl}}\bigl(\tfrac12\varpi - z\bigr)$. It has zeros for arguments $\bigl(a + \tfrac12\bigr)\varpi + b\varpi i$ and poles for arguments $a\varpi + \bigl(b + \tfrac12\bigr)\varpi i,$ with residues $(-1)^{a-b}i.$

Also
$$\operatorname{sl}z=\operatorname{sl}w\leftrightarrow z=(-1)^{m+n}w+(m+ni)\varpi$$
for some $m,n\in\mathbb{Z}$ and
$$\operatorname{sl}((1\pm i)z)=(1\pm i)\frac{\operatorname{sl}z}{\operatorname{sl}'z}.$$
The last formula is a special case of complex multiplication. Analogous formulas can be given for $\operatorname{sl}((n+mi)z)$ where $n+mi$ is any Gaussian integer – the function $\operatorname{sl}$ has complex multiplication by $\mathbb{Z}[i]$.

There are also infinite series reflecting the distribution of the zeros and poles of sl:
$$\frac{1}{\operatorname{sl}z}=\sum_{(n,k)\in\mathbb{Z}^2}\frac{(-1)^{n+k}}{z+n\varpi+k\varpi i}$$
$$\operatorname{sl}z=-i\sum_{(n,k)\in\mathbb{Z}^2}\frac{(-1)^{n+k}}{z+(n+1/2)\varpi +(k+1/2)\varpi i}.$$

=== Pythagorean-like identity ===
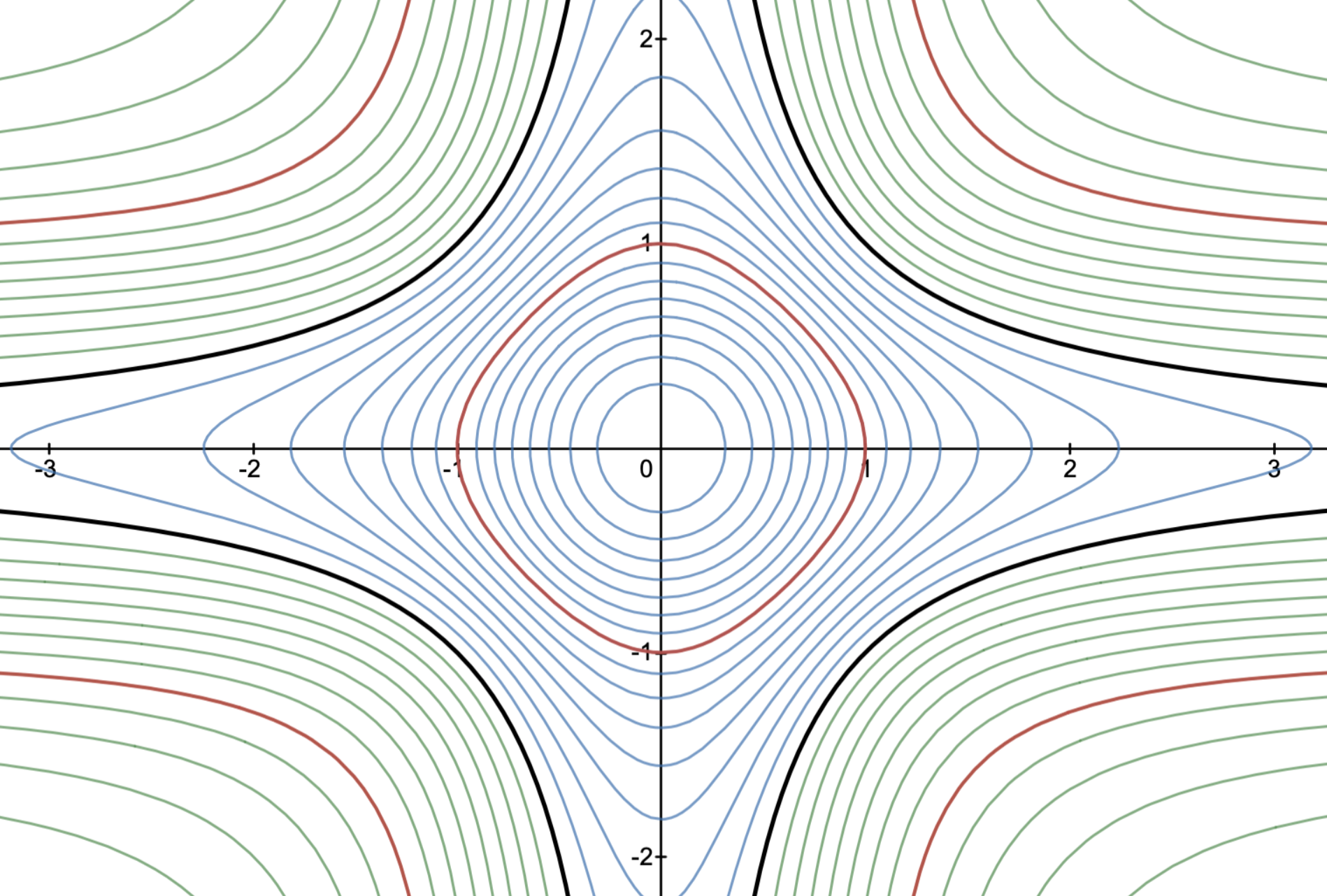
Curves x² ⊕ y² = a for various values of a. Negative a in green, positive a in blue, a = ±1 in red, a = ∞ in black.

The lemniscate functions satisfy a Pythagorean-like identity:
$$\operatorname{cl^2} z + \operatorname{sl^2} z + \operatorname{cl^2} z \, \operatorname{sl^2} z = 1$$

As a result, the parametric equation $(x, y) = (\operatorname{cl} t, \operatorname{sl} t)$ parametrizes the quartic curve $x^2 + y^2 + x^2y^2 = 1.$

This identity can alternately be rewritten:
$$\bigl(1 + \operatorname{cl^2} z\bigr) \bigl(1+\operatorname{sl^2} z\bigr) = 2$$
$$\operatorname{cl^2} z = \frac{1 - \operatorname{sl^2} z}{1 + \operatorname{sl^2} z},\quad
\operatorname{sl^2} z = \frac{1 - \operatorname{cl^2} z}{1 + \operatorname{cl^2} z}$$

Defining a tangent-sum operator as $a \oplus b \mathrel{:=} {}$$\tan(\arctan a + \arctan b) = {}$$\frac{a+b}{1-ab},$ gives:
$$\operatorname{cl^2} z \oplus \operatorname{sl^2} z = 1.$$

=== Derivatives and integrals ===
The derivatives are as follows:
$$\begin{aligned}
\frac{\mathrm{d}}{\mathrm{d}z}\operatorname{cl} z = \operatorname{cl'}z
&= -\bigl(1 + \operatorname{cl^2} z\bigr)\operatorname{sl}z=-\frac{2\operatorname{sl}z}{\operatorname{sl}^2z+1} \\
\operatorname{cl'^2} z &= 1 -  \operatorname{cl^4} z \\[5mu]
\frac{\mathrm{d}}{\mathrm{d}z}\operatorname{sl} z = \operatorname{sl'}z
&= \bigl(1 + \operatorname{sl^2} z\bigr)\operatorname{cl}z=\frac{2\operatorname{cl}z}{\operatorname{cl}^2z+1}\\
\operatorname{sl'^2} z &= 1 -  \operatorname{sl^4} z\end{aligned}$$
$$\begin{align}\frac{\mathrm d}{\mathrm dz}\,\tilde{\operatorname{cl}}\,z&=-2\,\tilde{\operatorname{sl}}\,z\,\operatorname{cl}z-\frac{\tilde{\operatorname{sl}}\,z}{\operatorname{cl}z}\\
\frac{\mathrm d}{\mathrm dz}\,\tilde{\operatorname{sl}}\,z&=2\,\tilde{\operatorname{cl}}\,z\,\operatorname{cl}z-\frac{\tilde{\operatorname{cl}}\,z}{\operatorname{cl}z}
\end{align}$$

The second derivatives of lemniscate sine and lemniscate cosine are their negative duplicated cubes:
$$\frac{\mathrm{d}^2}{\mathrm{d}z^2}\operatorname{cl}z = -2\operatorname{cl^3}z$$
$$\frac{\mathrm{d}^2}{\mathrm{d}z^2}\operatorname{sl}z = -2\operatorname{sl^3}z$$

The lemniscate functions can be integrated using the inverse tangent function:
$$\begin{align}\int\operatorname{cl} z \mathop{\mathrm{d}z}& = \arctan \operatorname{sl} z + C\\
\int\operatorname{sl} z \mathop{\mathrm{d}z}& = -\arctan \operatorname{cl} z + C\\
\int\tilde{\operatorname{cl}}\,z\,\mathrm dz&=\frac{\tilde{\operatorname{sl}}\,z}{\operatorname{cl}z}+C\\
\int\tilde{\operatorname{sl}}\,z\,\mathrm dz&=-\frac{\tilde{\operatorname{cl}}\,z}{\operatorname{cl}z}+C\end{align}$$

=== Argument sum and multiple identities ===
Like the trigonometric functions, the lemniscate functions satisfy argument sum and difference identities. The original identity used by Fagnano for bisection of the lemniscate was:
$$\operatorname{sl}(u+v) = \frac{\operatorname{sl}u\,\operatorname{sl'}v + \operatorname{sl}v\,\operatorname{sl'}u}
{1 + \operatorname{sl^2}u\, \operatorname{sl^2}v}$$

The derivative and Pythagorean-like identities can be used to rework the identity used by Fagano in terms of sl and cl. Defining a tangent-sum operator $a \oplus b \mathrel{:=} \tan(\arctan a + \arctan b)$ and tangent-difference operator $a \ominus b \mathrel{:=} a \oplus (-b),$ the argument sum and difference identities can be expressed as:
$$\begin{aligned}
\operatorname{cl}(u+v)
&= \operatorname{cl}u\,\operatorname{cl}v \ominus \operatorname{sl}u\, \operatorname{sl}v
= \frac{\operatorname{cl}u\, \operatorname{cl}v - \operatorname{sl}u\, \operatorname{sl}v}
{1 + \operatorname{sl}u\, \operatorname{cl}u\, \operatorname{sl}v\, \operatorname{cl}v} \\[2mu]
\operatorname{cl}(u-v)
&= \operatorname{cl}u\,\operatorname{cl}v \oplus \operatorname{sl}u\, \operatorname{sl}v \\[2mu]
\operatorname{sl}(u+v)
&= \operatorname{sl}u\,\operatorname{cl}v \oplus \operatorname{cl}u\,\operatorname{sl}v
= \frac{\operatorname{sl}u\, \operatorname{cl}v + \operatorname{cl}u\, \operatorname{sl}v}
{1 - \operatorname{sl}u\, \operatorname{cl}u\, \operatorname{sl}v\, \operatorname{cl}v} \\[2mu]
\operatorname{sl}(u-v)
&= \operatorname{sl}u\,\operatorname{cl}v \ominus \operatorname{cl}u\,\operatorname{sl}v
\end{aligned}$$

These resemble their trigonometric analogs:
$$\begin{aligned}
\cos(u \pm v) &= \cos u\,\cos v \mp \sin u\,\sin v \\[6mu]
\sin(u \pm v) &= \sin u\,\cos v \pm \cos u\,\sin v
\end{aligned}$$

In particular, to compute the complex-valued functions in real components,
$$\begin{aligned}
\operatorname{cl}(x + iy)
&= \frac{\operatorname{cl}x - i \operatorname{sl}x\, \operatorname{sl}y\, \operatorname{cl}y}
{\operatorname{cl}y + i \operatorname{sl}x\, \operatorname{cl}x\, \operatorname{sl}y} \\[4mu]
&= \frac{\operatorname{cl}x\,\operatorname{cl}y\left(1 - \operatorname{sl}^2x\,\operatorname{sl}^2y\right)}{\operatorname{cl}^2y + \operatorname{sl}^2x\,\operatorname{cl}^2x\,\operatorname{sl}^2y}
- i \frac{\operatorname{sl}x\,\operatorname{sl}y\left(\operatorname{cl}^2x + \operatorname{cl}^2y\right)}{\operatorname{cl}^2y + \operatorname{sl}^2x\,\operatorname{cl}^2x\,\operatorname{sl}^2y}
\\[12mu]
\operatorname{sl}(x + iy)
&= \frac{\operatorname{sl}x + i \operatorname{cl}x\, \operatorname{sl}y\, \operatorname{cl}y}
{\operatorname{cl}y - i \operatorname{sl}x\, \operatorname{cl}x\, \operatorname{sl}y } \\[4mu]
&= \frac{\operatorname{sl}x\,\operatorname{cl}y\left(1 - \operatorname{cl}^2x\,\operatorname{sl}^2y\right)}{\operatorname{cl}^2y + \operatorname{sl}^2x\,\operatorname{cl}^2x\,\operatorname{sl}^2y}
+ i \frac{\operatorname{cl}x\,\operatorname{sl}y\left(\operatorname{sl}^2x + \operatorname{cl}^2y\right)}{\operatorname{cl}^2y + \operatorname{sl}^2x\,\operatorname{cl}^2x\,\operatorname{sl}^2y}
\end{aligned}$$

Gauss discovered that
$$\frac{\operatorname{sl}(u-v)}{\operatorname{sl}(u+v)}=\frac{\operatorname{sl}((1+i)u)-\operatorname{sl}((1+i)v)}{\operatorname{sl}((1+i)u)+\operatorname{sl}((1+i)v)}$$
where $u,v\in\mathbb{C}$ such that both sides are well-defined.

Also
$$\operatorname{sl}(u+v)\operatorname{sl}(u-v)=\frac{\operatorname{sl}^2u-\operatorname{sl}^2v}{1+\operatorname{sl}^2u\operatorname{sl}^2v}$$
where $u,v\in\mathbb{C}$ such that both sides are well-defined; this resembles the trigonometric analog
$$\sin (u+v)\sin (u-v)=\sin^2u-\sin^2v.$$

Bisection formulas:
$$\operatorname{cl}^2 \tfrac12x = \frac{1+\operatorname{cl}x \sqrt{1+\operatorname{sl}^2x}}{1 + \sqrt{1+\operatorname{sl}^2x}}$$
$$\operatorname{sl}^2 \tfrac12x = \frac{1-\operatorname{cl}x\sqrt{1+\operatorname{sl}^2x}}{1 + \sqrt{1+\operatorname{sl}^2x}}$$

Duplication formulas:
$$\operatorname{cl} 2x = \frac{-1+2\,\operatorname{cl}^2x + \operatorname{cl}^4x}{1+2\,\operatorname{cl}^2x - \operatorname{cl}^4x}$$
$$\operatorname{sl} 2x = 2\,\operatorname{sl}x\,\operatorname{cl}x\frac{1+\operatorname{sl}^2x}{1+\operatorname{sl}^4x}$$

Triplication formulas:
$$\operatorname{cl} 3x = \frac{-3\,\operatorname{cl}x + 6\,\operatorname{cl}^5x + \operatorname{cl}^9x}{1+6\,\operatorname{cl}^4x - 3\,\operatorname{cl}^8x}$$
$$\operatorname{sl} 3x = \frac{\color{red}{3}\,\color{black}{\operatorname{sl}x -\, }\color{green}{6}\,\color{black}{\operatorname{sl}^5x -\,}\color{blue}{1}\,\color{black}{ \operatorname{sl}^9x}}{\color{blue}{1}\,\color{black}{+\,}\,\color{green}{6}\,\color{black}{\operatorname{sl}^4x -\, }\color{red}{3}\,\color{black}{\operatorname{sl}^8x}}$$

Note the "reverse symmetry" of the coefficients of numerator and denominator of $\operatorname{sl}3x$. This phenomenon can be observed in multiplication formulas for $\operatorname{sl}\beta x$ where $\beta=m+ni$ whenever $m,n\in\mathbb{Z}$ and $m+n$ is odd.

=== Lemnatomic polynomials ===
Let $L$ be the lattice
$$L=\mathbb{Z}(1+i)\varpi +\mathbb{Z}(1-i)\varpi.$$
Furthermore, let $K=\mathbb{Q}(i)$, $\mathcal{O}=\mathbb{Z}[i]$, $z\in\mathbb{C}$, $\beta=m+in$, $\gamma=m'+in'$ (where $m,n,m',n'\in\mathbb{Z}$), $m+n$ be odd, $m'+n'$ be odd, $\gamma\equiv 1\,\operatorname{mod}\, 2(1+i)$ and $\operatorname{sl} \beta z=M_\beta (\operatorname{sl}z)$. Then
$$M_\beta (x)=i^\varepsilon x \frac{P_\beta (x^4)}{Q_\beta (x^4)}$$
for some coprime polynomials $P_\beta (x), Q_\beta (x)\in \mathcal{O}[x]$ and some $\varepsilon\in \{0,1,2,3\}$ where
$$xP_\beta (x^4)=\prod_{\gamma |\beta}\Lambda_\gamma (x)$$
and
$$\Lambda_\beta (x)=\prod_{[\alpha]\in (\mathcal{O}/\beta\mathcal{O})^\times}(x-\operatorname{sl}\alpha\delta_\beta)$$
where $\delta_\beta$ is any $\beta$-torsion generator (i.e. $\delta_\beta \in (1/\beta)L$ and $[\delta_\beta]\in (1/\beta)L/L$ generates $(1/\beta)L/L$ as an $\mathcal{O}$-module). Examples of $\beta$-torsion generators include $2\varpi/\beta$ and $(1+i)\varpi/\beta$. The polynomial $\Lambda_\beta (x)\in\mathcal{O}[x]$ is called the $\beta$-th lemnatomic polynomial. It is monic and is irreducible over $K$. The lemnatomic polynomials are the "lemniscate analogs" of the cyclotomic polynomials,
$$\Phi_k(x)=\prod_{[a]\in (\mathbb{Z}/k\mathbb{Z})^\times}(x-\zeta_k^a).$$

The $\beta$-th lemnatomic polynomial $\Lambda_\beta(x)$ is the minimal polynomial of $\operatorname{sl}\delta_\beta$ in $K[x]$. For convenience, let $\omega_{\beta}=\operatorname{sl}(2\varpi/\beta)$ and $\tilde{\omega}_{\beta}=\operatorname{sl}((1+i)\varpi/\beta)$. So for example, the minimal polynomial of $\omega_5$ (and also of $\tilde{\omega}_5$) in $K[x]$ is
$$\Lambda_5(x)=x^{16}+52x^{12}-26x^8-12x^4+1,$$
and
$$\omega_5=\sqrt[4]{-13+6\sqrt{5}+2\sqrt{85-38\sqrt{5}}}$$
$$\tilde{\omega}_5=\sqrt[4]{-13-6\sqrt{5}+2\sqrt{85+38\sqrt{5}}}$$
(an equivalent expression is given in the table below). Another example is
$$\Lambda_{-1+2i}(x)=x^4-1+2i$$
which is the minimal polynomial of $\omega_{-1+2i}$ (and also of $\tilde{\omega}_{-1+2i}$) in $K[x].$

If $p$ is prime and $\beta$ is positive and odd, then
$$\operatorname{deg}\Lambda_{\beta}=\beta^2\prod_{p|\beta}\left(1-\frac{1}{p}\right)\left(1-\frac{(-1)^{(p-1)/2}}{p}\right)$$
which can be compared to the cyclotomic analog
$$\operatorname{deg}\Phi_{k}=k\prod_{p|k}\left(1-\frac{1}{p}\right).$$

=== Specific values ===
Just as for the trigonometric functions, values of the lemniscate functions can be computed for divisions of the lemniscate into $n$ parts of equal length, using only basic arithmetic and square roots, if and only if $n$ is of the form $n = 2^kp_1p_2\cdots p_m$ where $k$ is a non-negative integer and each $p_i$ (if any) is a distinct Fermat prime.

$n$	$\operatorname{cl}n\varpi$	$\operatorname{sl}n\varpi$
$1$	$-1$	$0$
$\tfrac{5}{6}$	$-\sqrt[4]{2\sqrt{3}-3}$	$\tfrac12\bigl(\sqrt{3}+1-\sqrt[4]{12}\bigr)$
$\tfrac{3}{4}$	$-\sqrt{\sqrt2-1}$	$\sqrt{\sqrt2-1}$
$\tfrac{2}{3}$	$-\tfrac12\bigl(\sqrt{3}+1-\sqrt[4]{12}\bigr)$	$\sqrt[4]{2\sqrt{3}-3}$
$\tfrac{1}{2}$	$0$	$1$
$\tfrac{1}{3}$	$\tfrac12\bigl(\sqrt{3}+1-\sqrt[4]{12}\bigr)$	$\sqrt[4]{2\sqrt{3}-3}$
$\tfrac{1}{4}$	$\sqrt{\sqrt2-1}$	$\sqrt{\sqrt2-1}$
$\tfrac{1}{6}$	$\sqrt[4]{2\sqrt{3}-3}$	$\tfrac12\bigl(\sqrt{3}+1-\sqrt[4]{12}\bigr)$

== Relation to geometric shapes ==
=== Arc length of Bernoulli's lemniscate ===
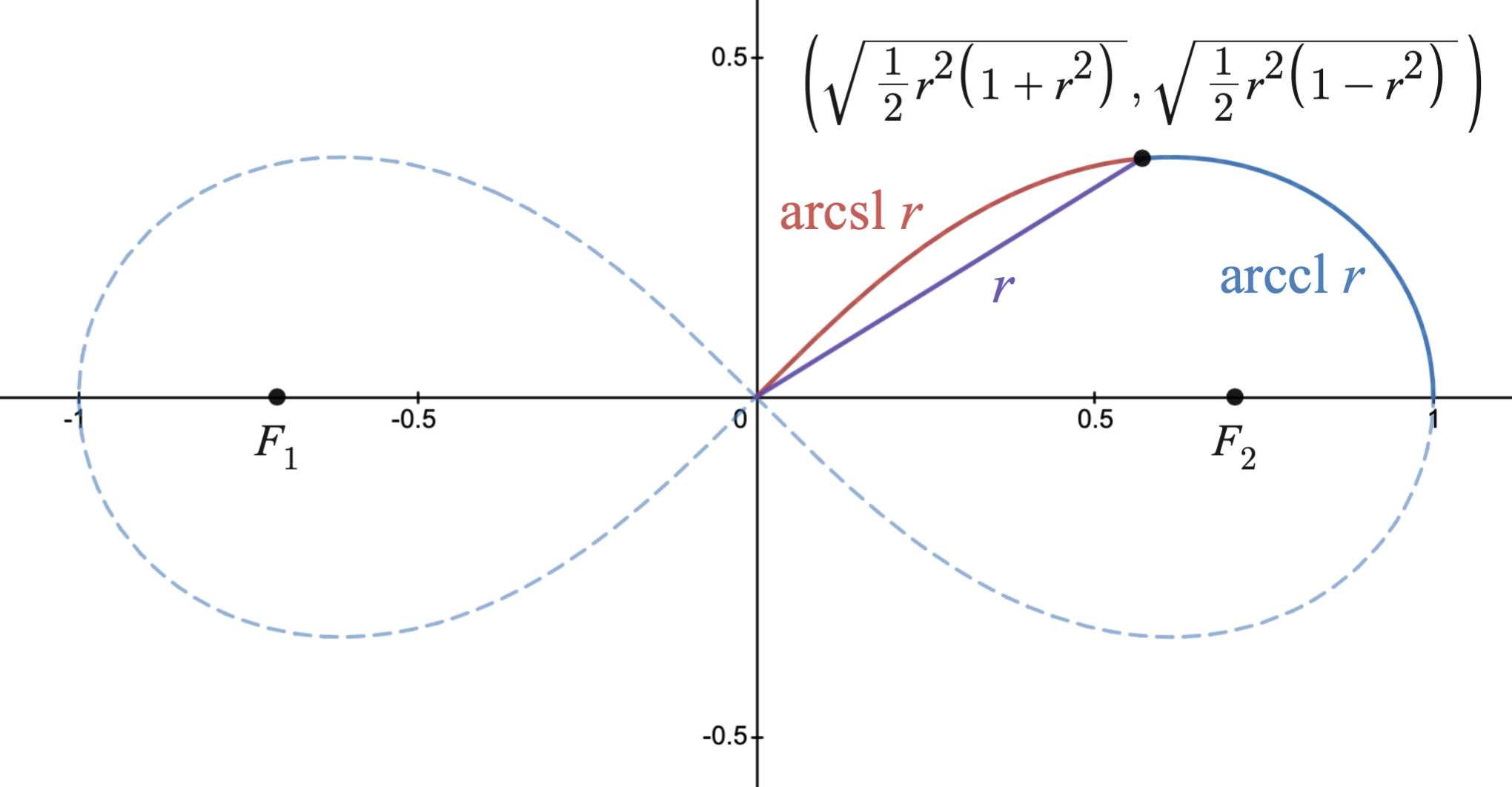
The lemniscate sine and cosine relate the arc length of an arc of the lemniscate to the distance of one endpoint from the origin.

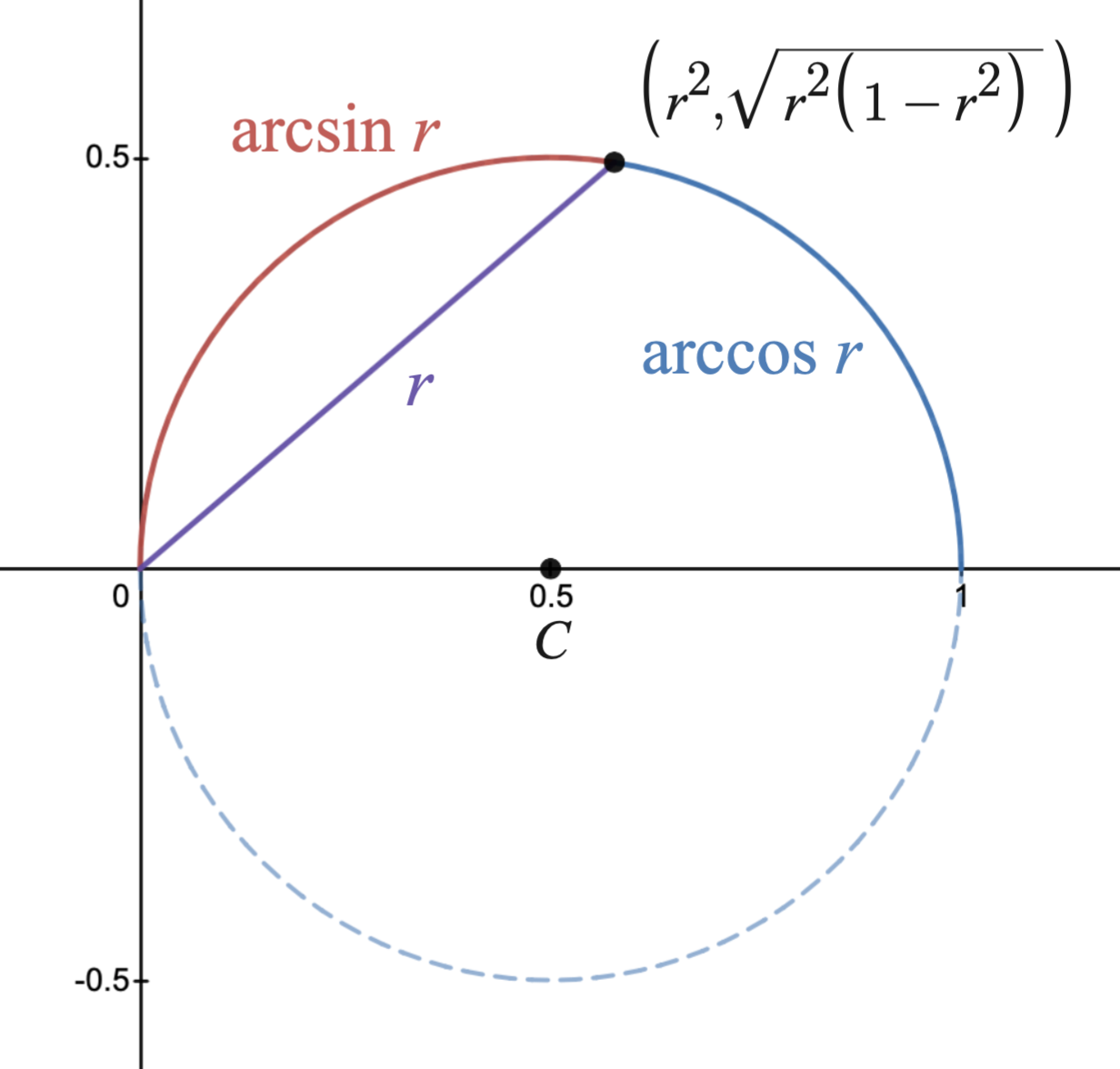
The trigonometric sine and cosine analogously relate the arc length of an arc of a unit-diameter circle to the distance of one endpoint from the origin.

$\mathcal{L}$, the lemniscate of Bernoulli with unit distance from its center to its furthest point (i.e. with unit "half-width"), is essential in the theory of the lemniscate elliptic functions. It can be characterized in at least three ways:

Angular characterization: Given two points $A$ and $B$ which are unit distance apart, let $B'$ be the reflection of $B$ about $A$. Then $\mathcal{L}$ is the closure of the locus of the points $P$ such that $|APB-APB'|$ is a right angle.

Focal characterization: $\mathcal{L}$ is the locus of points in the plane such that the product of their distances from the two focal points $F_1 = \bigl({-\tfrac1\sqrt2},0\bigr)$ and $F_2 = \bigl(\tfrac1\sqrt2,0\bigr)$ is the constant $\tfrac12$.

Explicit coordinate characterization: $\mathcal{L}$ is a quartic curve satisfying the polar equation $r^2 = \cos 2\theta$ or the Cartesian equation $\bigl(x^2+y^2\bigr){}^2=x^2-y^2.$

The perimeter of $\mathcal{L}$ is $2\varpi$.

The points on $\mathcal{L}$ at distance $r$ from the origin are the intersections of the circle $x^2+y^2=r^2$ and the hyperbola $x^2-y^2=r^4$. The intersection in the positive quadrant has Cartesian coordinates:
$$\big(x(r), y(r)\big) = \biggl(\!\sqrt{\tfrac12r^2\bigl(1 + r^2\bigr)},\, \sqrt{\tfrac12r^2\bigl(1 - r^2\bigr)}\,\biggr).$$

Using this parametrization with $r \in [0, 1]$ for a quarter of $\mathcal{L}$, the arc length from the origin to a point $\big(x(r), y(r)\big)$ is:
$$\begin{aligned}
&\int_0^r \sqrt{x'(t)^2 + y'(t)^2} \mathop{\mathrm{d}t} \\
& \quad {}= \int_0^r \sqrt{\frac{(1+2t^2)^2}{2(1+t^2)} + \frac{(1-2t^2)^2}{2(1-t^2)}} \mathop{\mathrm{d}t} \\[6mu]
& \quad {}= \int_0^r \frac{\mathrm{d}t}{\sqrt{1-t^4}} \\[6mu]
& \quad {}= \operatorname{arcsl} r.
\end{aligned}$$

Likewise, the arc length from $(1,0)$ to $\big(x(r), y(r)\big)$ is:
$$\begin{aligned}
&\int_r^1 \sqrt{x'(t)^2 + y'(t)^2} \mathop{\mathrm{d}t} \\
& \quad {}= \int_r^1 \frac{\mathrm{d}t}{\sqrt{1-t^4}} \\[6mu]
& \quad {}= \operatorname{arccl} r = \tfrac12\varpi - \operatorname{arcsl} r.
\end{aligned}$$

Or in the inverse direction, the lemniscate sine and cosine functions give the distance from the origin as functions of arc length from the origin and the point $(1,0)$, respectively.

Analogously, the circular sine and cosine functions relate the chord length to the arc length for the unit diameter circle with polar equation $r = \cos \theta$ or Cartesian equation $x^2 + y^2 = x,$ using the same argument above but with the parametrization:
$$\big(x(r), y(r)\big) = \biggl(r^2,\, \sqrt{r^2\bigl(1-r^2\bigr)}\,\biggr).$$

Alternatively, just as the unit circle $x^2+y^2=1$ is parametrized in terms of the arc length $s$ from the point $(1,0)$ by
$$(x(s),y(s))=(\cos s,\sin s),$$
$\mathcal{L}$ is parametrized in terms of the arc length $s$ from the point $(1,0)$ by
$$(x(s),y(s))=\left(\frac{\operatorname{cl}s}{\sqrt{1+\operatorname{sl}^2 s}},\frac{\operatorname{sl}s\operatorname{cl}s}{\sqrt{1+\operatorname{sl}^2 s}}\right)=\left(\tilde{\operatorname{cl}}\,s,\tilde{\operatorname{sl}}\,s\right).$$

The notation $\tilde{\operatorname{cl}},\,\tilde{\operatorname{sl}}$ is used solely for the purposes of this article; in references, notation for general Jacobi elliptic functions is used instead.

The lemniscate integral and lemniscate functions satisfy an argument duplication identity discovered by Fagnano in 1718:
$$\int_0^z \frac{\mathrm{d}t}{\sqrt{1 - t^4}} = 2 \int_0^u \frac{\mathrm{d}t}{\sqrt{1 - t^4}}, \quad \text{if }
z = \frac{2u\sqrt{1 - u^4}}{1 + u^4} \text{ and } 0\le u\le\sqrt{\sqrt{2}-1}.$$

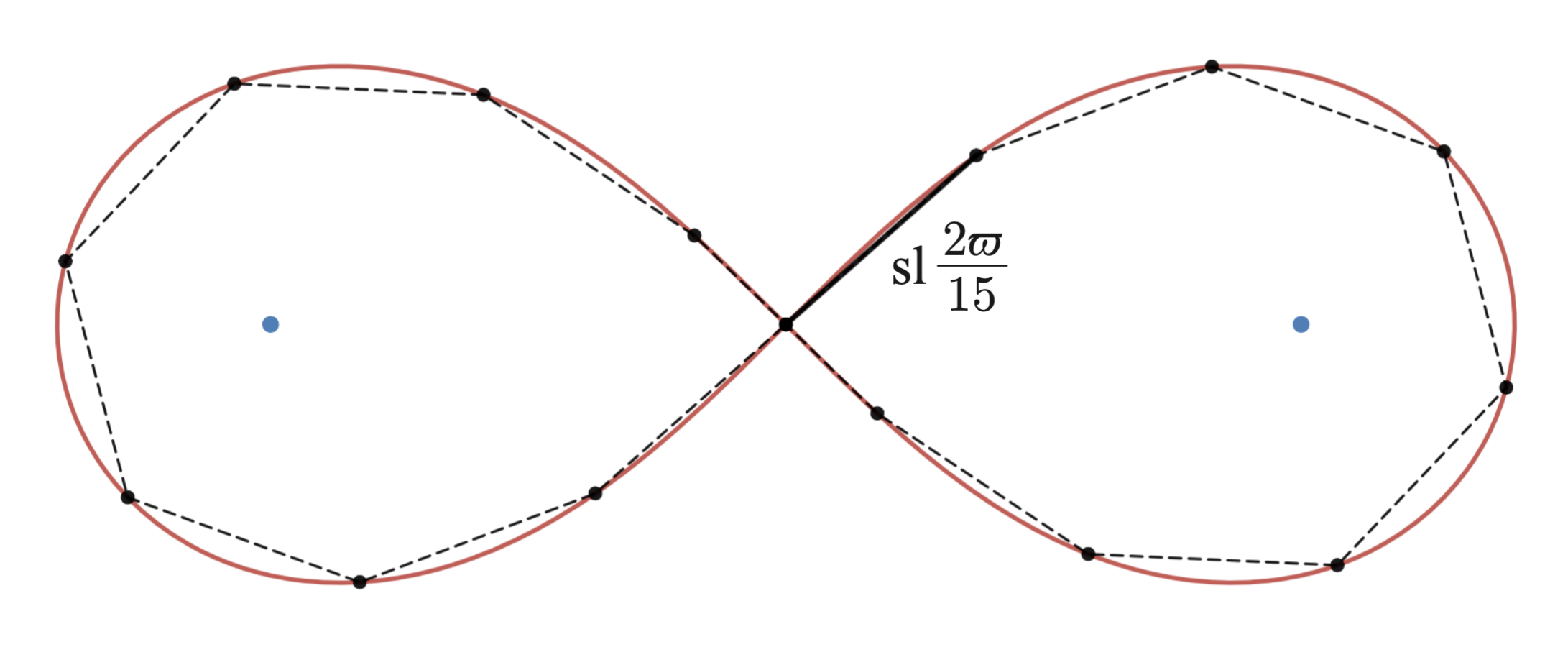
A lemniscate divided into 15 sections of equal arclength (red curves). Because the prime factors of 15 (3 and 5) are both Fermat primes, this polygon (in black) is constructible using a straightedge and compass.

Later mathematicians generalized this result. Analogously to the constructible polygons in the circle, the lemniscate can be divided into $n$ sections of equal arc length using only straightedge and compass if and only if $n$ is of the form $n = 2^kp_1p_2\cdots p_m$ where $k$ is a non-negative integer and each $p_i$ (if any) is a distinct Fermat prime. The "if" part of the theorem was proved by Niels Abel in 1827–1828, and the "only if" part was proved by Michael Rosen in 1981. Equivalently, the lemniscate can be divided into $n$ sections of equal arc length using only straightedge and compass if and only if $\varphi (n)$ is a power of two (where $\varphi$ is Euler's totient function). The lemniscate is not assumed to be already drawn, as that would go against the rules of straightedge and compass constructions; instead, it is assumed that we are given only two points by which the lemniscate is defined, such as its center and radial point (one of the two points on the lemniscate such that their distance from the center is maximal) or its two foci.

Let $r_j=\operatorname{sl}\dfrac{2j\varpi}{n}$. Then the $n$-division points for $\mathcal{L}$ are the points
$$\left(r_j\sqrt{\tfrac12\bigl(1+r_j^2\bigr)},\ (-1)^{\left\lfloor 4j/n\right\rfloor} \sqrt{\tfrac12r_j^2\bigl(1-r_j^2\bigr)}\right),\quad j\in\{1,2,\ldots ,n\}$$
where $\lfloor\cdot\rfloor$ is the floor function. See below for some specific values of $\operatorname{sl}\dfrac{2\varpi}{n}$.

=== Arc length of rectangular elastica ===
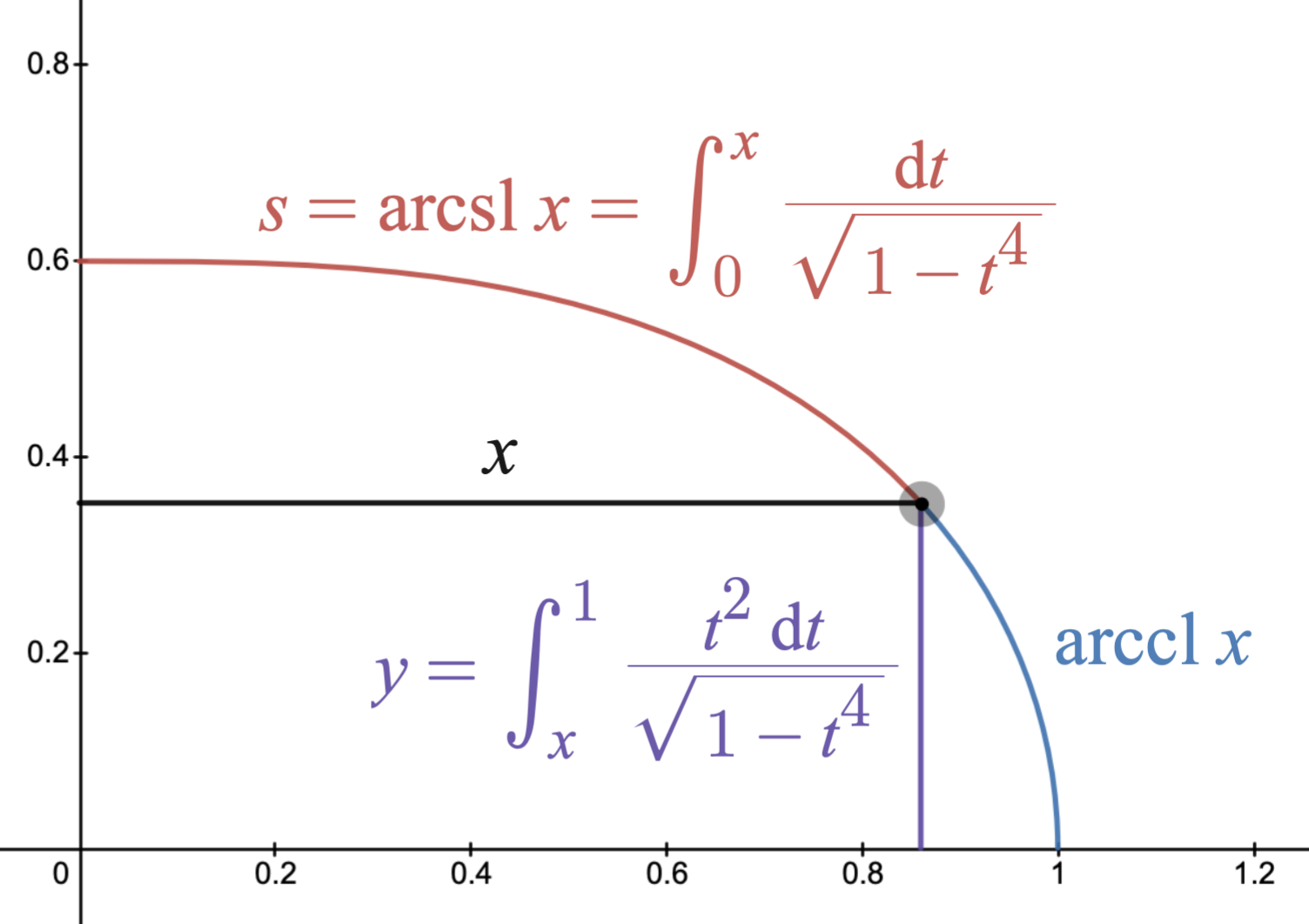
The lemniscate sine relates the arc length to the x coordinate in the rectangular elastica.

The inverse lemniscate sine also describes the arc length $s$ relative to the $x$ coordinate of the rectangular elastica. This curve has $y$ coordinate and arc length:
$$y = \int_x^1 \frac{t^2\mathop{\mathrm{d}t}}{\sqrt{1 - t^4}},\quad s = \operatorname{arcsl} x = \int_0^x \frac{\mathrm{d}t}{\sqrt{1 - t^4}}$$

The rectangular elastica solves a problem posed by Jacob Bernoulli, in 1691, to describe the shape of an idealized flexible rod fixed in a vertical orientation at the bottom end, and pulled down by a weight from the far end until it has been bent horizontal. Bernoulli's proposed solution established Euler–Bernoulli beam theory, further developed by Euler in the 18th century.

=== Elliptic characterization ===
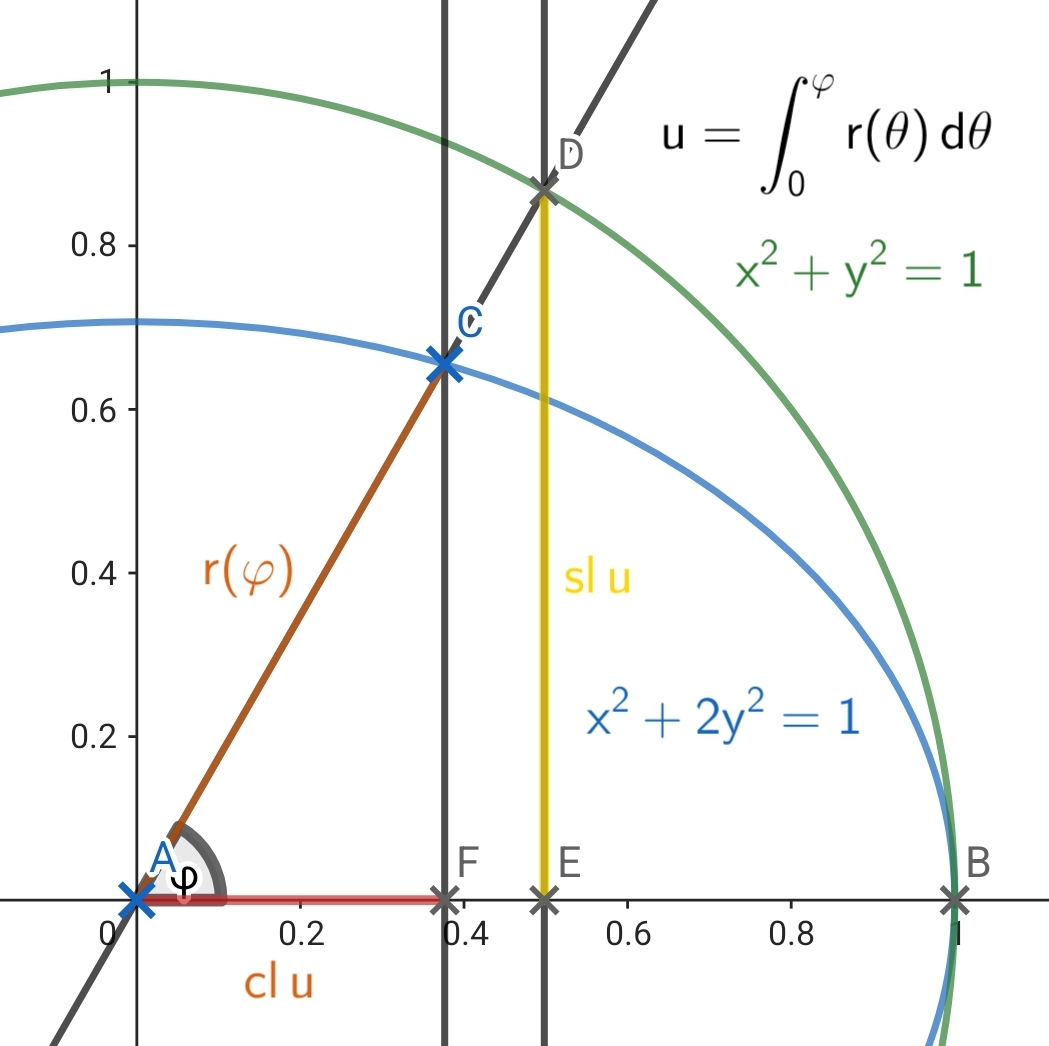
The lemniscate elliptic functions and an ellipse

Let $C$ be a point on the ellipse $x^2+2y^2=1$ in the first quadrant and let $D$ be the projection of $C$ on the unit circle $x^2+y^2=1$. The distance $r$ between the origin $A$ and the point $C$ is a function of $\varphi$ (the angle $BAC$ where $B=(1,0)$; equivalently the length of the circular arc $BD$). The parameter $u$ is given by
$$u=\int_0^{\varphi}r(\theta)\, \mathrm d\theta=\int_0^{\varphi}\frac{\mathrm d\theta}{\sqrt{1+\sin^2\theta}}.$$
If $E$ is the projection of $D$ on the $x$-axis and if $F$ is the projection of $C$ on the $x$-axis, then the lemniscate elliptic functions are given by
$$\operatorname{cl}u=\overline{AF}, \quad \operatorname{sl}u=\overline{DE},$$
$$\tilde{\operatorname{cl}}\, u=\overline{AF}\overline{AC}, \quad \tilde{\operatorname{sl}}\, u=\overline{AF}\overline{FC}.$$

== Series Identities ==
=== Power series ===
The power series expansion of the lemniscate sine at the origin is
$$\operatorname{sl}z=\sum_{n=0}^\infty a_n z^n=z-12\frac{z^5}{5!}+3024\frac{z^9}{9!}-4390848\frac{z^{13}}{13!}+\cdots,\quad |z|< \tfrac{\varpi}{\sqrt{2}}$$
where the coefficients $a_n$ are determined as follows:
$$n\not\equiv 1\pmod 4\implies a_n=0,$$
$$a_1=1,\, \forall n\in\mathbb{N}_0:\,a_{n+2}=-\frac{2}{(n+1)(n+2)}\sum_{i+j+k=n}a_ia_ja_k$$
where $i+j+k=n$ stands for all three-term compositions of $n$. For example, to evaluate $a_{13}$, it can be seen that there are only six compositions of $13-2=11$ that give a nonzero contribution to the sum: $11=9+1+1=1+9+1=1+1+9$ and $11=5+5+1=5+1+5=1+5+5$, so
$$a_{13}=-\tfrac{2}{12\cdot 13}(a_9a_1a_1+a_1a_9a_1+a_1a_1a_9+a_5a_5a_1+a_5a_1a_5+a_1a_5a_5)=-\tfrac{11}{15600}.$$

The expansion can be equivalently written as
$$\operatorname{sl}z=\sum_{n=0}^\infty p_{2n} \frac{z^{4n+1}}{(4n+1)!},\quad \left|z\right|<\frac{\varpi}{\sqrt{2}}$$
where
$$p_{n+2}=-12\sum_{j=0}^n\binom{2n+2}{2j+2}p_{n-j}\sum_{k=0}^j \binom{2j+1}{2k+1}p_k p_{j-k},\quad p_0=1,\, p_1=0.$$

The power series expansion of $\tilde{\operatorname{sl}}$ at the origin is
$$\tilde{\operatorname{sl}}\,z=\sum_{n=0}^\infty \alpha_n z^n=z-9\frac{z^3}{3!}+153\frac{z^5}{5!}-4977\frac{z^7}{7!}+\cdots,\quad \left|z\right|<\frac{\varpi}{2}$$
where $\alpha_n=0$ if $n$ is even and
$$\alpha_n=\sqrt{2}\frac{\pi}{\varpi}\frac{(-1)^{(n-1)/2}}{n!}\sum_{k=1}^{\infty}\frac{(2k\pi/\varpi)^{n+1}}{\cosh k\pi},\quad \left|\alpha_n\right|\sim 2^{n+5/2}\frac{n+1}{\varpi^{n+2}}$$
if $n$ is odd.

The expansion can be equivalently written as
$$\tilde{\operatorname{sl}}\, z=\sum_{n=0}^\infty \frac{(-1)^n}{2^{n+1}} \left(\sum_{l=0}^n 2^l \binom{2n+2}{2l+1} s_l t_{n-l}\right)\frac{z^{2n+1}}{(2n+1)!} ,\quad \left|z\right|<\frac{\varpi}{2}$$
where
$$s_{n+2}=3 s_{n+1} +24 \sum_{j=0}^n \binom{2n+2}{2j+2} s_{n-j} \sum_{k=0}^j \binom{2j+1}{2k+1} s_k s_{j-k},\quad s_0=1,\, s_1=3,$$
$$t_{n+2}=3 t_{n+1}+3 \sum_{j=0}^n \binom{2n+2}{2j+2} t_{n-j} \sum_{k=0}^j \binom{2j+1}{2k+1} t_k t_{j-k},\quad t_0=1,\, t_1=3.$$

For the lemniscate cosine,
$$\operatorname{cl}{z}=1-\sum_{n=0}^\infty (-1)^n \left(\sum_{l=0}^n 2^l \binom{2n+2}{2l+1} q_l r_{n-l}\right) \frac{z^{2n+2}}{(2n+2)!}=1-2\frac{z^2}{2!}+12\frac{z^4}{4!}-216\frac{z^6}{6!}+\cdots ,\quad \left|z\right|<\frac{\varpi}{2},$$
$$\tilde{\operatorname{cl}}\,z=\sum_{n=0}^\infty (-1)^n 2^n q_n \frac{z^{2n}}{(2n)!}=1-3\frac{z^2}{2!}+33\frac{z^4}{4!}-819\frac{z^6}{6!}+\cdots ,\quad\left|z\right|<\frac{\varpi}{2}$$
where
$$r_{n+2}=3 \sum_{j=0}^n \binom{2n+2}{2j+2} r_{n-j} \sum_{k=0}^j \binom{2j+1}{2k+1} r_k r_{j-k},\quad r_0=1,\, r_1=0,$$
$$q_{n+2}=\tfrac{3}{2} q_{n+1}+6 \sum_{j=0}^n \binom{2n+2}{2j+2} q_{n-j} \sum_{k=0}^j \binom{2j+1}{2k+1} q_k q_{j-k},\quad q_0=1, \,q_1=\tfrac{3}{2}.$$

=== Ramanujan's cos/cosh identity ===
Ramanujan's famous cos/cosh identity states that if
$$R(s)=\frac{\pi}{\varpi\sqrt{2}}\sum_{n\in\mathbb{Z}}\frac{\cos (2n\pi s/\varpi)}{\cosh n\pi},$$
then
$$R(s)^{-2}+R(is)^{-2}=2,\quad \left|\operatorname{Re}s\right|< \frac{\varpi}{2},\left|\operatorname{Im}s\right|< \frac{\varpi}{2}.$$
There is a close relation between the lemniscate functions and $R(s)$. Indeed,
$$\tilde{\operatorname{sl}}\,s=-\frac{\mathrm d}{\mathrm ds}R(s)\quad \left|\operatorname{Im}s\right|<\frac{\varpi}{2}$$
$$\tilde{\operatorname{cl}}\,s=\frac{\mathrm d}{\mathrm ds}\sqrt{1-R(s)^2},\quad \left|\operatorname{Re}s-\frac{\varpi}{2}\right|<\frac{\varpi}{2},\,\left|\operatorname{Im}s\right|<\frac{\varpi}{2}$$
and
$$R(s)=\frac{1}{\sqrt{1+\operatorname{sl}^2 s}},\quad \left|\operatorname{Im}s\right
|<\frac{\varpi}{2}.$$

=== Continued fractions ===
For $z\in\mathbb{C}\setminus\{0\}$:
$$\int_0^\infty e^{-tz\sqrt{2}}\operatorname{cl}t\, \mathrm dt=\cfrac{1/\sqrt{2}}{z+\cfrac{a_1}{z+\cfrac{a_2}{z+\cfrac{a_3}{z+\ddots}}}},\quad a_n=\frac{n^2}{4}((-1)^{n+1}+3)$$
$$\int_0^\infty e^{-tz\sqrt{2}}\operatorname{sl}t\operatorname{cl}t \, \mathrm dt=\cfrac{1/2}{z^2+b_1-\cfrac{a_1}{z^2+b_2-\cfrac{a_2}{z^2+b_3-\ddots}}},\quad a_n=n^2(4n^2-1),\, b_n=3(2n-1)^2$$

=== Methods of computation ===
A fast algorithm, returning approximations to $\operatorname{sl} x$ (which get closer to $\operatorname{sl}x$ with increasing $N$), is the following:

- $a_0 \leftarrow 1;$ $b_0 \leftarrow \tfrac{1}{\sqrt2};$ $c_0 \leftarrow\sqrt{\tfrac12}$
- for each $n\ge 1$ do
  - $a_n \leftarrow \tfrac12(a_{n-1}+b_{n-1});$ $b_n \leftarrow \sqrt{a_{n-1}b_{n-1}};$ $c_n \leftarrow \tfrac12(a_{n-1}-b_{n-1})$
  - if $c_n < \textrm{tolerance}$ then
    - $N \leftarrow n;$ break
- $\phi_N \leftarrow 2^N a_N \sqrt2x$
- for each $n$ from $N$ to $0$ do
  - $\phi_{n-1} \leftarrow \tfrac12\left(\phi_n + {\arcsin}{\left(\frac{c_n}{a_n}\sin \phi_n\right)}\right)$
- return $\frac{\sin \phi_0}{\sqrt{2-\sin^2\phi_0}}$

This is effectively using the arithmetic-geometric mean and is based on Landen's transformations.

Several methods of computing $\operatorname{sl} x$ involve first making the change of variables $\pi x = \varpi \tilde{x}$ and then computing $\operatorname{sl}(\varpi \tilde{x} / \pi).$

A hyperbolic series method:
$$\operatorname{sl}\left(\frac{\varpi}{\pi}x\right)=\frac{\pi}{\varpi}\sum_{n\in\mathbb{Z}} \frac{(-1)^n}{\cosh (x-(n+1/2)\pi)},\quad x\in\mathbb{C}$$
$$\frac{1}{\operatorname{sl}(\varpi x/\pi)} = \frac\pi\varpi \sum_{n\in\mathbb{Z}}\frac{(-1)^n}{{\sinh} {\left(x-n\pi\right)}}=\frac\pi\varpi \sum_{n\in\mathbb{Z}}\frac{(-1)^n}{\sin (x-n\pi i)},\quad x\in\mathbb{C}$$

Fourier series method:
$$\operatorname{sl}\Bigl(\frac{\varpi}{\pi}x\Bigr)=\frac{2\pi}{\varpi}\sum_{n=0}^\infty \frac{(-1)^n\sin ((2n+1)x)}{\cosh ((n+1/2)\pi)},\quad \left|\operatorname{Im}x\right|<\frac{\pi}{2}$$
$$\operatorname{cl}\left(\frac{\varpi}{\pi}x\right)=\frac{2\pi}{\varpi}\sum_{n=0}^\infty \frac{\cos ((2n+1)x)}{\cosh ((n+1/2)\pi)},\quad\left|\operatorname{Im}x\right|<\frac{\pi}{2}$$
$$\frac{1}{\operatorname{sl}(\varpi x/\pi)}=\frac{\pi}{\varpi}\left(\frac{1}{\sin x}-4\sum_{n=0}^\infty \frac{\sin ((2n+1)x)}{e^{(2n+1)\pi}+1}\right),\quad\left|\operatorname{Im}x\right|<\pi$$

The lemniscate functions can be computed more rapidly by
$$\begin{align}\operatorname{sl}\Bigl(\frac\varpi\pi x\Bigr)& = \frac{{\theta_1}{\left(x, e^{-\pi}\right)}}{{\theta_3}{\left(x, e^{-\pi}\right)}},\quad x\in\mathbb{C}\\
\operatorname{cl}\Bigl(\frac\varpi\pi x\Bigr)&=\frac{{\theta_2}{\left(x, e^{-\pi}\right)}}{{\theta_4}{\left(x, e^{-\pi}\right)}},\quad x\in\mathbb{C}\end{align}$$
where
$$\begin{aligned}
\theta_1(x,e^{-\pi})&=\sum_{n\in\mathbb{Z}}(-1)^{n+1}e^{-\pi (n+1/2+x/\pi)^2}=\sum_{n\in\mathbb{Z}} (-1)^n e^{-\pi (n+1/2)^2}\sin ((2n+1)x),\\
\theta_2(x,e^{-\pi})&=\sum_{n\in\mathbb{Z}}(-1)^n e^{-\pi (n+x/\pi)^2}=\sum_{n\in\mathbb{Z}} e^{-\pi (n+1/2)^2}\cos ((2n+1)x),\\
\theta_3(x,e^{-\pi})&=\sum_{n\in\mathbb{Z}}e^{-\pi (n+x/\pi)^2}=\sum_{n\in\mathbb{Z}} e^{-\pi n^2}\cos 2nx,\\
\theta_4(x,e^{-\pi})&=\sum_{n\in\mathbb{Z}}e^{-\pi (n+1/2+x/\pi)^2}=\sum_{n\in\mathbb{Z}} (-1)^n e^{-\pi n^2}\cos 2nx\end{aligned}$$
are the Jacobi theta functions.

Fourier series for the logarithm of the lemniscate sine:
$$\ln \operatorname{sl}\left(\frac\varpi\pi x\right)=\ln 2-\frac{\pi}{4}+\ln\sin x+2\sum_{n=1}^\infty \frac{(-1)^n \cos 2nx}{n(e^{n\pi}+(-1)^n)},\quad \left|\operatorname{Im}x\right|<\frac{\pi}{2}$$

The following series identities were discovered by Ramanujan:
$$\frac{\varpi ^2}{\pi ^2\operatorname{sl}^2(\varpi x/\pi)}=\frac{1}{\sin ^2x}-\frac{1}{\pi}-8\sum_{n=1}^\infty \frac{n\cos 2nx}{e^{2n\pi}-1},\quad \left|\operatorname{Im}x\right|<\pi$$
$$\arctan\operatorname{sl}\Bigl(\frac\varpi\pi x\Bigr)=2\sum_{n=0}^\infty \frac{\sin((2n+1)x)}{(2n+1)\cosh ((n+1/2)\pi)},\quad \left|\operatorname{Im}x\right|<\frac{\pi}{2}$$

The functions $\tilde{\operatorname{sl}}$ and $\tilde{\operatorname{cl}}$ analogous to $\sin$ and $\cos$ on the unit circle have the following Fourier and hyperbolic series expansions:
$$\tilde{\operatorname{sl}}\,s=2\sqrt{2}\frac{\pi^2}{\varpi^2}\sum_{n=1}^\infty\frac{n\sin (2n\pi s/\varpi)}{\cosh n\pi},\quad \left|\operatorname{Im}s\right|<\frac{\varpi}{2}$$
$$\tilde{\operatorname{cl}}\,s=\sqrt{2}\frac{\pi^2}{\varpi^2}\sum_{n=0}^\infty \frac{(2n+1)\cos ((2n+1)\pi s/\varpi)}{\sinh ((n+1/2)\pi)},\quad \left|\operatorname{Im}s\right|<\frac{\varpi}{2}$$
$$\tilde{\operatorname{sl}}\,s=\frac{\pi^2}{\varpi^2\sqrt{2}}\sum_{n\in\mathbb{Z}}\frac{\sinh (\pi (n+s/\varpi))}{\cosh^2 (\pi (n+s/\varpi))},\quad s\in\mathbb{C}$$
$$\tilde{\operatorname{cl}}\,s=\frac{\pi^2}{\varpi^2\sqrt{2}}\sum_{n\in\mathbb{Z}}\frac{(-1)^n}{\cosh^2 (\pi (n+s/\varpi))},\quad s\in\mathbb{C}$$

The following identities come from product representations of the theta functions:
$$\mathrm{sl}\Bigl(\frac\varpi\pi x\Bigr) = 2e^{-\pi/4}\sin x\prod_{n = 1}^{\infty} \frac{1-2e^{-2n\pi}\cos 2x+e^{-4n\pi}}{1+2e^{-(2n-1)\pi}\cos 2x+e^{-(4n-2)\pi}},\quad x\in\mathbb{C}$$
$$\mathrm{cl}\Bigl(\frac\varpi\pi x\Bigr) = 2e^{-\pi/4}\cos x\prod_{n = 1}^{\infty} \frac{1+2e^{-2n\pi}\cos 2x+e^{-4n\pi}}{1-2e^{-(2n-1)\pi}\cos 2x+e^{-(4n-2)\pi}},\quad x\in\mathbb{C}$$

A similar formula involving the $\operatorname{sn}$ function can be given.

=== The lemniscate functions as a ratio of entire functions ===
Since the lemniscate sine is a meromorphic function in the whole complex plane, it can be written as a ratio of entire functions. Gauss showed that sl has the following product expansion, reflecting the distribution of its zeros and poles:
$$\operatorname{sl}z=\frac{M(z)}{N(z)}$$
where
$$M(z)=z\prod_{\alpha}\left(1-\frac{z^4}{\alpha^4}\right),\quad N(z)=\prod_{\beta}\left(1-\frac{z^4}{\beta^4}\right).$$

Here, $\alpha$ and $\beta$ denote, respectively, the zeros and poles of sl which are in the quadrant $\operatorname{Re}z>0,\operatorname{Im}z\ge 0$. A proof can be found in. Importantly, the infinite products converge to the same value for all possible orders in which their terms can be multiplied, as a consequence of uniform convergence.

Proof of the infinite product for the lemniscate sine

Proof by logarithmic differentiation

It can be easily seen (using uniform and absolute convergence arguments to justify interchanging of limiting operations) that
$$\frac{M'(z)}{M(z)}=-\sum_{n=0}^\infty 2^{4n}\mathrm{H}_{4n}\frac{z^{4n-1}}{(4n)!},\quad \left|z\right|<\varpi$$
(where $\mathrm{H}_n$ are the Hurwitz numbers defined in Lemniscate elliptic functions § Hurwitz numbers) and
$$\frac{N'(z)}{N(z)}=(1+i)\frac{M'((1+i)z)}{M((1+i)z)}-\frac{M'(z)}{M(z)}.$$
Therefore
$$\frac{N'(z)}{N(z)}=\sum_{n=0}^\infty 2^{4n}(1-(-1)^n 2^{2n})\mathrm{H}_{4n}\frac{z^{4n-1}}{(4n)!},\quad \left|z\right|<\frac{\varpi}{\sqrt{2}}.$$
It is known that
$$\frac{1}{\operatorname{sl}^2z}=\sum_{n=0}^\infty 2^{4n}(4n-1)\mathrm{H}_{4n}\frac{z^{4n-2}}{(4n)!},\quad \left|z\right|<\varpi.$$
Then from
$$\frac{\mathrm d}{\mathrm dz}\frac{\operatorname{sl}'z}{\operatorname{sl}z}=-\frac{1}{\operatorname{sl}^2z}-\operatorname{sl}^2z$$
and
$$\operatorname{sl}^2z=\frac{1}{\operatorname{sl}^2z}-\frac{(1+i)^2}{\operatorname{sl}^2((1+i)z)}$$
we get
$$\frac{\operatorname{sl}'z}{\operatorname{sl}z}=-\sum_{n=0}^\infty 2^{4n}(2-(-1)^n 2^{2n})\mathrm{H}_{4n}\frac{z^{4n-1}}{(4n)!},\quad \left|z\right|<\frac{\varpi}{\sqrt{2}}.$$
Hence
$$\frac{\operatorname{sl}'z}{\operatorname{sl}z}=\frac{M'(z)}{M(z)}-\frac{N'(z)}{N(z)},\quad \left|z\right|<\frac{\varpi}{\sqrt{2}}.$$
Therefore
$$\operatorname{sl}z=C\frac{M(z)}{N(z)}$$
for some constant $C$ for $\left|z\right|<\varpi/\sqrt{2}$ but this result holds for all $z\in\mathbb{C}$ by analytic continuation. Using
$$\lim_{z\to 0}\frac{\operatorname{sl}z}{z}=1$$
gives $C=1$ which completes the proof. $\blacksquare$

Proof by Liouville's theorem

Let
$$f(z)=\frac{M(z)}{N(z)}=\frac{(1+i)M(z)^2}{M((1+i)z)},$$
with patches at removable singularities. The shifting formulas
$$M(z+2\varpi)=e^{2\frac{\pi}{\varpi}(z+\varpi)}M(z),\quad M(z+2\varpi i)=e^{-2\frac{\pi}{\varpi}(iz-\varpi)}M(z)$$
imply that $f$ is an elliptic function with periods $2\varpi$ and $2\varpi i$, just as $\operatorname{sl}$. It follows that the function $g$ defined by
$$g(z)=\frac{\operatorname{sl}z}{f(z)},$$
when patched, is an elliptic function without poles. By Liouville's theorem, it is a constant. By using $\operatorname{sl}z=z+\operatorname{O}(z^5)$, $M(z)=z+\operatorname{O}(z^5)$ and $N(z)=1+\operatorname{O}(z^4)$, this constant is $1$, which proves the theorem. $\blacksquare$

Gauss conjectured that $\ln N(\varpi)=\pi/2$ (this later turned out to be true) and commented that this “is most remarkable and a proof of this property promises the most serious increase in analysis”. Gauss expanded the products for $M$ and $N$ as infinite series (see below). He also discovered several identities involving the functions $M$ and $N$, such as

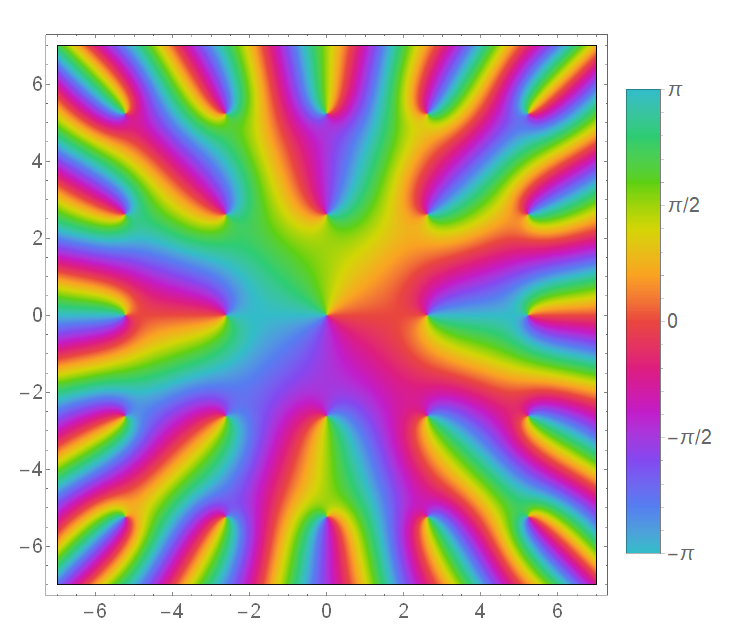
The M function in the complex plane. The complex argument is represented by varying hue.

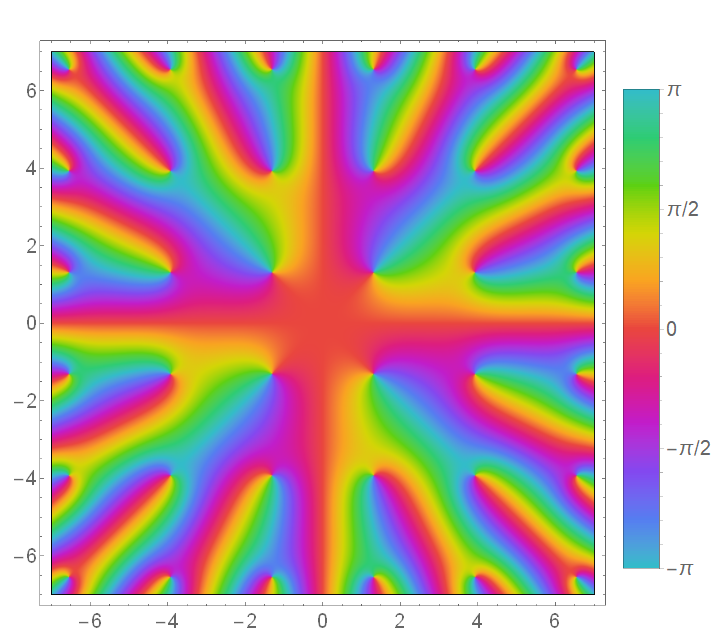
The N function in the complex plane. The complex argument is represented by varying hue.

$$N(z)=\frac{M((1+i)z)}{(1+i)M(z)},\quad z\notin \varpi\mathbb{Z}[i]$$
and
$$N(2z)=M(z)^4+N(z)^4.$$

Thanks to a certain theorem on splitting limits, we are allowed to multiply out the infinite products and collect like powers of $z$. Doing so gives the following power series expansions that are convergent everywhere in the complex plane:
$$M(z)=z-2\frac{z^5}{5!}-36\frac{z^9}{9!}+552\frac{z^{13}}{13!}+\cdots,\quad z\in\mathbb{C}$$
$$N(z)=1+2\frac{z^4}{4!}-4\frac{z^8}{8!}+408\frac{z^{12}}{12!}+\cdots,\quad z\in\mathbb{C}.$$

This can be contrasted with the power series of $\operatorname{sl}$ which has only finite radius of convergence (because it is not entire).

We define $S$ and $T$ by
$$S(z)=N\left(\frac{z}{1+i}\right)^2-iM\left(\frac{z}{1+i}\right)^2,\quad T(z)=S(iz).$$
Then the lemniscate cosine can be written as
$$\operatorname{cl}z=\frac{S(z)}{T(z)}$$
where
$$S(z)=1-\frac{z^2}{2!}-\frac{z^4}{4!}-3\frac{z^6}{6!}+17\frac{z^8}{8!}-9\frac{z^{10}}{10!}+111\frac{z^{12}}{12!}+\cdots,\quad z\in\mathbb{C}$$
$$T(z)=1+\frac{z^2}{2!}-\frac{z^4}{4!}+3\frac{z^6}{6!}+17\frac{z^8}{8!}+9\frac{z^{10}}{10!}+111\frac{z^{12}}{12!}+\cdots,\quad z\in\mathbb{C}.$$

Furthermore, the identities
$$M(2z)=2 M(z) N(z) S(z) T(z),$$
$$S(2z)=S(z)^4-2M(z)^4,$$
$$T(2z)=T(z)^4-2M(z)^4$$
and the Pythagorean-like identities
$$M(z)^2+S(z)^2=N(z)^2,$$
$$M(z)^2+N(z)^2=T(z)^2$$
hold for all $z\in\mathbb{C}$.

The quasi-addition formulas
$$M(z+w)M(z-w)=M(z)^2N(w)^2-N(z)^2M(w)^2,$$
$$N(z+w)N(z-w)=N(z)^2N(w)^2+M(z)^2M(w)^2$$
(where $z,w\in\mathbb{C}$) imply further multiplication formulas for $M$ and $N$ by recursion.

Gauss' $M$ and $N$ satisfy the following system of differential equations:
$$M(z)M''(z)=M'(z)^2-N(z)^2,$$
$$N(z)N''(z)=N'(z)^2+M(z)^2$$
where $z\in\mathbb{C}$. Both $M$ and $N$ satisfy the differential equation
$$X(z)X''''(z)=4X'(z)X'''(z)-3X''(z)^2+2X(z)^2,\quad z\in\mathbb{C}.$$
The functions can be also expressed by integrals involving elliptic functions:
$$M(z)=z\exp\left(-\int_0^z\int_0^w \left(\frac{1}{\operatorname{sl}^2v}-\frac{1}{v^2}\right)\, \mathrm dv\,\mathrm dw\right),$$
$$N(z)=\exp\left(\int_0^z\int_0^w \operatorname{sl}^2v\,\mathrm dv\,\mathrm dw\right)$$
where the contours do not cross the poles; while the innermost integrals are path-independent, the outermost ones are path-dependent; however, the path dependence cancels out with the non-injectivity of the complex exponential function.

An alternative way of expressing the lemniscate functions as a ratio of entire functions involves the theta functions (see Lemniscate elliptic functions § Methods of computation); the relation between $M,N$ and $\theta_1,\theta_3$ is
$$M(z)=2^{-1/4}e^{\pi z^2/(2\varpi^2)}\sqrt{\frac{\pi}{\varpi}}\theta_1\left(\frac{\pi z}{\varpi},e^{-\pi}\right),$$
$$N(z)=2^{-1/4}e^{\pi z^2/(2\varpi^2)}\sqrt{\frac{\pi}{\varpi}}\theta_3\left(\frac{\pi z}{\varpi},e^{-\pi}\right)$$
where $z\in\mathbb{C}$.

== Relation to other functions ==
=== Relation to Weierstrass and Jacobi elliptic functions ===
The lemniscate functions are closely related to the Weierstrass elliptic function $\wp(z; 1, 0)$ (the "lemniscatic case"), with invariants $g_2 = 1$ and $g_3 = 0$. This lattice has fundamental periods $\omega_1 = \sqrt{2}\varpi,$ and $\omega_2 = i\omega_1$. The associated constants of the Weierstrass function are $e_1=\tfrac12,\ e_2=0,\ e_3=-\tfrac12.$

The related case of a Weierstrass elliptic function with $g_2 = a$, $g_3 = 0$ may be handled by a scaling transformation. However, this may involve complex numbers. If it is desired to remain within real numbers, there are two cases to consider: $a > 0$ and $a < 0$. The period parallelogram is either a square or a rhombus. The Weierstrass elliptic function $\wp (z;-1,0)$ is called the "pseudolemniscatic case".

The square of the lemniscate sine can be represented as
$$\operatorname{sl}^2 z=\frac{1}{\wp (z;4,0)}=\frac{i}{2\wp ((1-i)z;-1,0)}={-2\wp}{\left(\sqrt2z+(i-1)\frac{\varpi}{\sqrt2};1,0\right)}$$
where the second and third argument of $\wp$ denote the lattice invariants $g_2$ and $g_3$. The lemniscate sine is a rational function in the Weierstrass elliptic function and its derivative:
$$\operatorname{sl}z=-2\frac{\wp (z;-1,0)}{\wp '(z;-1,0)}.$$

The lemniscate functions can also be written in terms of Jacobi elliptic functions. The Jacobi elliptic functions $\operatorname{sn}$ and $\operatorname{cd}$ with positive real elliptic modulus have an "upright" rectangular lattice aligned with real and imaginary axes. Alternately, the functions $\operatorname{sn}$ and $\operatorname{cd}$ with modulus $i$ (and $\operatorname{sd}$ and $\operatorname{cn}$ with modulus $1/\sqrt{2}$) have a square period lattice rotated 1/8 turn.
$$\operatorname{sl} z = \operatorname{sn}(z;i)=\operatorname{sc}(z;\sqrt{2})={\tfrac1{\sqrt2}\operatorname{sd}}\left(\sqrt2z;\tfrac{1}{\sqrt2}\right)$$
$$\operatorname{cl} z = \operatorname{cd}(z;i)= \operatorname{dn}(z;\sqrt{2})={\operatorname{cn}}\left(\sqrt2z;\tfrac{1}{\sqrt2}\right)$$
where the second arguments denote the elliptic modulus $k$.

The functions $\tilde{\operatorname{sl}}$ and $\tilde{\operatorname{cl}}$ can also be expressed in terms of Jacobi elliptic functions:
$$\tilde{\operatorname{sl}}\,z=\operatorname{cd}(z;i)\operatorname{sd}(z;i)=\operatorname{dn}(z;\sqrt{2})\operatorname{sn}(z;\sqrt{2})=\tfrac{1}{\sqrt{2}}\operatorname{cn}\left(\sqrt{2}z;\tfrac{1}{\sqrt{2}}\right)\operatorname{sn}\left(\sqrt{2}z;\tfrac{1}{\sqrt{2}}\right),$$
$$\tilde{\operatorname{cl}}\,z=\operatorname{cd}(z;i)\operatorname{nd}(z;i)=\operatorname{dn}(z;\sqrt{2})\operatorname{cn}(z;\sqrt{2})=\operatorname{cn}\left(\sqrt{2}z;\tfrac{1}{\sqrt{2}}\right)\operatorname{dn}\left(\sqrt{2}z;\tfrac{1}{\sqrt{2}}\right).$$

=== Relation to the modular lambda function ===
The lemniscate sine can be used for the computation of values of the modular lambda function:
$$\prod_{k=1}^n \;{\operatorname{sl}}{\left(\frac{2k-1}{2n+1}\frac{\varpi}{2}\right)}
=\sqrt[8]{\frac{\lambda ((2n+1)i)}{1-\lambda ((2n+1)i)}}$$

For example:
$$\begin{aligned}
&{\operatorname{sl}}\bigl(\tfrac1{14}\varpi\bigr)\,{\operatorname{sl}}\bigl(\tfrac3{14}\varpi\bigr)\,{\operatorname{sl}}\bigl(\tfrac5{14}\varpi\bigr) \\[7mu]
&\quad {}= \sqrt[8]{\frac{\lambda (7i)}{1-\lambda (7i)}}
= {\tan}\Bigl({\tfrac{1}{2}\arccsc}\Bigl(\tfrac{1}{2}\sqrt{8\sqrt{7}+21}+\tfrac{1}{2}\sqrt{7}+1\Bigr)\Bigr)
\\[7mu]
&\quad {}= \frac 2 {2 + \sqrt{7} + \sqrt{21 + 8 \sqrt{7}} + \sqrt{2 {14 + 6 \sqrt{7} + \sqrt{455 + 172 \sqrt{7}}}}}
\\[18mu]
& {\operatorname{sl}}\bigl(\tfrac1{18}\varpi\bigr)\, {\operatorname{sl}}\bigl(\tfrac3{18}\varpi\bigr)\,{\operatorname{sl}}\bigl(\tfrac5{18}\varpi\bigr)\,{\operatorname{sl}}\bigl(\tfrac7{18}\varpi\bigr) \\
&\quad {}= \sqrt[8]{\frac{\lambda (9i)}{1-\lambda (9i)}}
= \tan\left(\vphantom{\frac\Big|\Big|}\right. \frac\pi4 - \arctan\left(\vphantom{\frac\Big|\Big|}\right.\frac{2\sqrt[3]{2\sqrt{3}-2}-2\sqrt[3]{2-\sqrt{3}}+\sqrt{3}-1}{\sqrt[4]{12}}\left.\left.\vphantom{\frac\Big|\Big|}\right)\right)
\end{aligned}$$

== Inverse functions ==
The inverse function of the lemniscate sine is the lemniscate arcsine, defined as
$$\operatorname{arcsl} x = \int_0^x \frac{\mathrm dt}{\sqrt{1-t^4}}.$$

It can also be represented by the hypergeometric function:
$$\operatorname{arcsl}x=x\,{}_2F_1\bigl(\tfrac12,\tfrac14;\tfrac54;x^4\bigr)$$
which can be easily seen by using the binomial series.

The inverse function of the lemniscate cosine is the lemniscate arccosine. This function is defined by following expression:
$$\operatorname{arccl} x = \int_{x}^{1} \frac{\mathrm dt}{\sqrt{1-t^4}} = \tfrac12\varpi - \operatorname{arcsl}x$$

For $x$ in the interval $-1 \leq x \leq 1$, $\operatorname{sl}\operatorname{arcsl} x = x$ and $\operatorname{cl}\operatorname{arccl} x = x$

For the halving of the lemniscate arc length these formulas are valid:
$$\begin{aligned}
{\operatorname{sl}}\bigl(\tfrac12\operatorname{arcsl} x\bigr) &= {\sin}\bigl(\tfrac12\arcsin x\bigr) \,{\operatorname{sech}}\bigl(\tfrac12\operatorname{arsinh} x\bigr) \\
{\operatorname{sl}}\bigl(\tfrac12\operatorname{arcsl} x\bigr)^2 &= {\tan}\bigl(\tfrac14\arcsin x^2\bigr)
\end{aligned}$$

Furthermore there are the so called Hyperbolic lemniscate area functions:

$$\operatorname{aslh}(x) = \int_{0}^{x} \frac{1}{\sqrt{y^4 + 1}} \mathrm{d}y = \tfrac{1}{2}F\left(2\arctan x; \tfrac{1}{\sqrt2}\right)$$

$$\operatorname{aclh}(x) = \int_{x}^{\infty} \frac{1}{\sqrt{y^4 + 1}} \mathrm{d}y = \tfrac12 F\left(2\arccot x; \tfrac{1}{\sqrt2}\right)$$

$$\operatorname{aclh}(x) = \frac{\varpi}{\sqrt{2}} - \operatorname{aslh}(x)$$

$$\operatorname{aslh}(x) = \sqrt{2}\operatorname{arcsl}\left(x \Big/ \sqrt{\textstyle 1 + \sqrt{x^4 + 1}} \right)$$

$$\operatorname{arcsl}(x) = \sqrt{2}\operatorname{aslh}\left(x \Big/ \sqrt{\textstyle 1 + \sqrt{1 - x^4}}\right)$$

=== Expression using elliptic integrals ===
The lemniscate arcsine and the lemniscate arccosine can also be expressed by the Legendre-Form:

These functions can be displayed directly by using the incomplete elliptic integral of the first kind:
$$\operatorname{arcsl} x = \frac{1}{\sqrt2}F\left({\arcsin}{\frac{\sqrt2x}{\sqrt{1+x^2}}};\frac{1}{\sqrt2}\right)$$
$$\operatorname{arcsl} x = 2(\sqrt2-1)F\left({\arcsin}{\frac{(\sqrt2+1)x}{\sqrt{1+x^2}+1}};(\sqrt2-1)^2\right)$$

The arc lengths of the lemniscate can also be expressed by only using the arc lengths of ellipses (calculated by elliptic integrals of the second kind):
$$\begin{aligned}
\operatorname{arcsl} x = {}&\frac{2+\sqrt2}{2}E\left({\arcsin}{\frac{(\sqrt2+1)x}{\sqrt{1+x^2}+1}};(\sqrt2-1)^2\right) \\[5mu]
&\ \ - E\left({\arcsin}{\frac{\sqrt2x}{\sqrt{1+x^2}}};\frac{1}{\sqrt2}\right) + \frac{x\sqrt{1-x^2}}{\sqrt2(1+x^2+\sqrt{1+x^2})}
\end{aligned}$$

The lemniscate arccosine has this expression:
$$\operatorname{arccl} x = \frac{1}{\sqrt2}F\left(\arccos x;\frac{1}{\sqrt2}\right)$$

=== Use in integration ===
The lemniscate arcsine can be used to integrate many functions. Here is a list of important integrals (the constants of integration are omitted):

$$\int\frac{1}{\sqrt{1-x^4}}\,\mathrm dx=\operatorname{arcsl} x$$

$$\int\frac{1}{\sqrt{(x^2+1)(2x^2+1)}}\,\mathrm dx={\operatorname{arcsl}}{\frac{x}{\sqrt{x^2+1}}}$$

$$\int\frac{1}{\sqrt{x^4+6x^2+1}}\,\mathrm dx={\operatorname{arcsl}}{\frac{\sqrt2x}{\sqrt{\sqrt{x^4+6x^2+1}+x^2+1}}}$$

$$\int\frac{1}{\sqrt{x^4+1}}\,\mathrm dx={\sqrt2\operatorname{arcsl}}{\frac{x}{\sqrt{\sqrt{x^4+1}+1}}}$$

$$\int\frac{1}{\sqrt[4]{(1-x^4)^3}}\,\mathrm dx={\sqrt2\operatorname{arcsl}}{\frac{x}{\sqrt{1+\sqrt{1-x^4}}}}$$

$$\int\frac{1}{\sqrt[4]{(x^4+1)^3}}\,\mathrm dx={\operatorname{arcsl}}{\frac{x}{\sqrt[4]{x^4+1}}}$$

$$\int\frac{1}{\sqrt[4]{(1-x^2)^3}}\,\mathrm dx={2\operatorname{arcsl}}{\frac{x}{1+\sqrt{1-x^2}}}$$

$$\int\frac{1}{\sqrt[4]{(x^2+1)^3}}\,\mathrm dx={2\operatorname{arcsl}}{\frac{x}{\sqrt{x^2+1}+1}}$$

$$\int\frac{1}{\sqrt[4]{(ax^2+bx+c)^3}}\,\mathrm dx={\frac{2\sqrt2}{\sqrt[4]{4a^2c-ab^2}}\operatorname{arcsl}}{\frac{2ax+b}{\sqrt{4a(ax^2+bx+c)}+\sqrt{4ac-b^2}}}$$

$$\int\sqrt{\operatorname{sech} x}\,\mathrm dx={2\operatorname{arcsl}}\tanh \tfrac12x$$

$$\int\sqrt{\sec x}\,\mathrm dx={2\operatorname{arcsl}}\tan \tfrac12x$$

== Hyperbolic lemniscate functions ==
=== Fundamental information ===
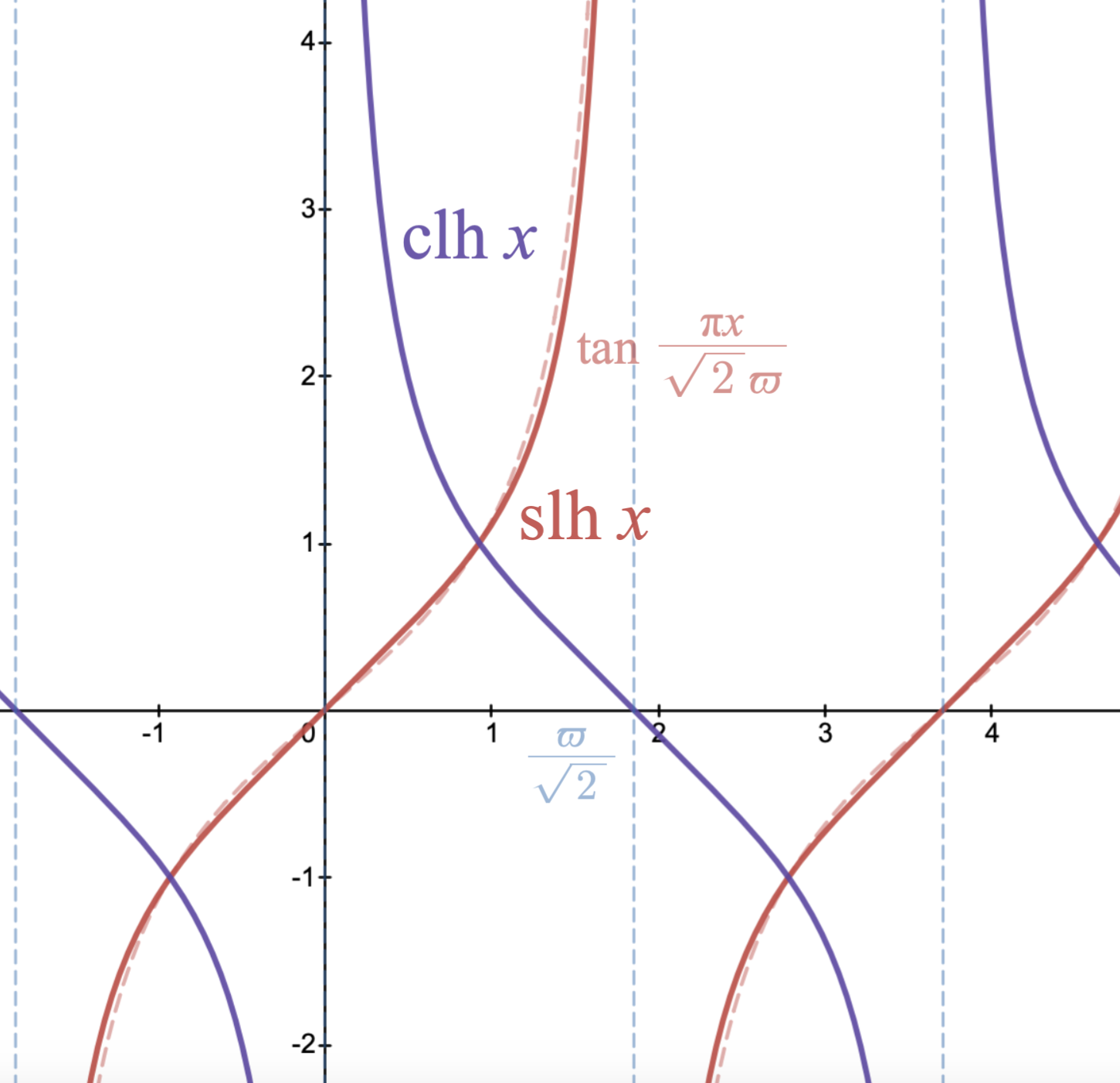
The hyperbolic lemniscate sine (red) and hyperbolic lemniscate cosine (purple) applied to a real argument, in comparison with the trigonometric tangent (pale dashed red).

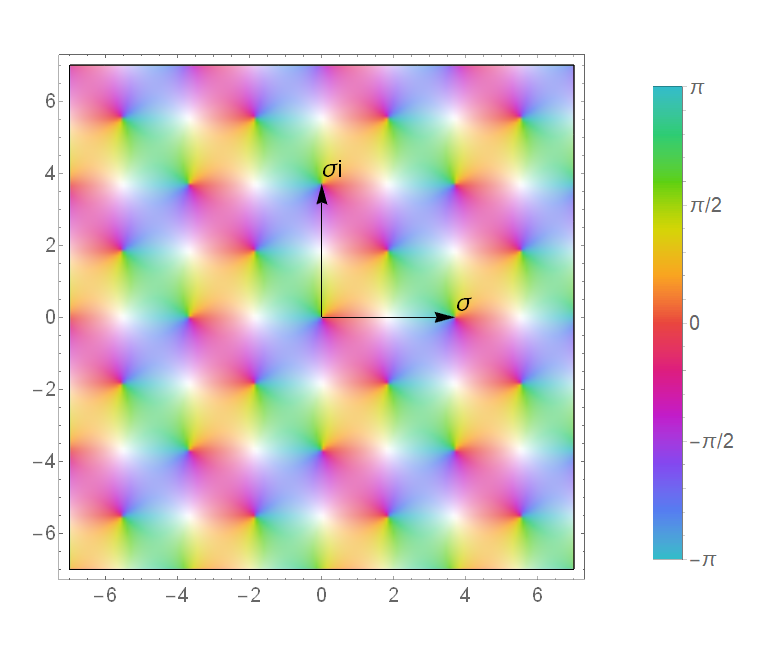
The hyperbolic lemniscate sine in the complex plane. Dark areas represent zeros and bright areas represent poles. The complex argument is represented by varying hue.

For convenience, let $\sigma=\sqrt{2}\varpi$. $\sigma$ is the "squircular" analog of $\pi$ (see below). The decimal expansion of $\sigma$ (i.e. $3.7081\ldots$) appears in entry 34e of chapter 11 of Ramanujan's second notebook.

The hyperbolic lemniscate sine (slh) and cosine (clh) can be defined as inverses of elliptic integrals as follows:
$$z \mathrel{\overset{*}{=}} \int_0^{\operatorname{slh} z} \frac{\mathrm{d}t}{\sqrt{1 + t^4}} = \int_{\operatorname{clh} z}^\infty \frac{\mathrm{d}t}{\sqrt{1 + t^4}}$$
where in $(*)$, $z$ is in the square with corners $\{\sigma/2, \sigma i/2,-\sigma/2,-\sigma i/2\}$. Beyond that square, the functions can be analytically continued to meromorphic functions in the whole complex plane.

The complete integral has the value:
$$\int_0^\infty \frac{\mathrm{d}t}{\sqrt{t^4 + 1}} = \tfrac14 \Beta\bigl(\tfrac14, \tfrac14\bigr) = \frac{\sigma}{2} = 1.85407\;46773\;01371\ldots$$

Therefore, the two defined functions have following relation to each other:
$$\operatorname{slh} z = {\operatorname{clh}}{\Bigl(\frac{\sigma}{2} - z \Bigr)}$$

The product of hyperbolic lemniscate sine and hyperbolic lemniscate cosine is equal to one:
$$\operatorname{slh}z\,\operatorname{clh}z = 1$$

The functions $\operatorname{slh}$ and $\operatorname{clh}$ have a square period lattice with fundamental periods $\{\sigma,\sigma i\}$.

The hyperbolic lemniscate functions can be expressed in terms of lemniscate sine and lemniscate cosine:
$$\operatorname{slh}\bigl(\sqrt2 z\bigr) = \frac{(1+\operatorname{cl}^2 z)\operatorname{sl}z}{\sqrt2\operatorname{cl}z}$$
$$\operatorname{clh}\bigl(\sqrt2 z\bigr) = \frac{(1 + \operatorname{sl}^2 z)\operatorname{cl}z}{\sqrt2\operatorname{sl}z}$$

But there is also a relation to the Jacobi elliptic functions with the elliptic modulus one by square root of two:
$$\operatorname{slh}z = \frac{\operatorname{sn}(z;1/\sqrt2)}{\operatorname{cd}(z;1/\sqrt2)}$$
$$\operatorname{clh}z = \frac{\operatorname{cd}(z;1/\sqrt2)}{\operatorname{sn}(z;1/\sqrt2)}$$

The hyperbolic lemniscate sine has following imaginary relation to the lemniscate sine:
$$\operatorname{slh}z
= \frac{1-i}{\sqrt2} \operatorname{sl}\left(\frac{1+i}{\sqrt2}z\right)
= \frac{\operatorname{sl}\left(\sqrt[4]{-1}z\right) }{ \sqrt[4]{-1} }$$

This is analogous to the relationship between hyperbolic and trigonometric sine:
$$\sinh z
= -i \sin (iz)
= \frac{\sin\left(\sqrt[2]{-1}z\right) }{ \sqrt[2]{-1}}$$

=== Relation to quartic Fermat curve ===
==== Hyperbolic Lemniscate Tangent and Cotangent ====
This image shows the standardized superelliptic Fermat squircle curve of the fourth degree:

Superellipse with the relation x^{4} + y^{4} = 1

In a quartic Fermat curve $x^4 + y^4 = 1$ (sometimes called a squircle) the hyperbolic lemniscate sine and cosine are analogous to the tangent and cotangent functions in a unit circle $x^2 + y^2 = 1$ (the quadratic Fermat curve). If the origin and a point on the curve are connected to each other by a line $L$, the hyperbolic lemniscate sine of twice the enclosed area between this line and the x-axis is the y-coordinate of the intersection of $L$ with the line $x = 1$. Just as $\pi$ is the area enclosed by the circle $x^2+y^2=1$, the area enclosed by the squircle $x^4+y^4=1$ is $\sigma$. Moreover,
$$M(1,1/\sqrt{2})=\frac{\pi}{\sigma}$$
where $M$ is the arithmetic–geometric mean.

The hyperbolic lemniscate sine satisfies the argument addition identity:
$$\operatorname{slh}(a+b) = \frac{\operatorname{slh}a\operatorname{slh}'b + \operatorname{slh}b\operatorname{slh}'a}{1-\operatorname{slh}^2a\,\operatorname{slh}^2b}$$

When $u$ is real, the derivative and the original antiderivative of $\operatorname{slh}$ and $\operatorname{clh}$ can be expressed in this way:

$\frac{\mathrm{d}}{\mathrm{d}u}\operatorname{slh}(u) = \sqrt{1 + \operatorname{slh}(u)^4}$

$\frac{\mathrm{d}}{\mathrm{d}u}\operatorname{clh}(u) = -\sqrt{1 + \operatorname{clh}(u)^4}$

$\frac{\mathrm{d}}{\mathrm{d}u} \,\frac{1}{2} \operatorname{arsinh}\bigl[ \operatorname{slh}(u)^2 \bigr] = \operatorname{slh}(u)$

$\frac{\mathrm{d}}{\mathrm{d}u} -\,\frac{1}{2} \operatorname{arsinh}\bigl[ \operatorname{clh}(u)^2 \bigr] = \operatorname{clh}(u)$

There are also the Hyperbolic lemniscate tangent and the Hyperbolic lemniscate cotangent as further functions:

The functions tlh and ctlh fulfill the identities described in the differential equation mentioned:
$$\text{tlh}(\sqrt{2}\,u) = \sin_{4}(\sqrt{2}\,u) = \operatorname{sl}(u)\sqrt{\frac{\operatorname{cl}^2 u+1}{\operatorname{sl}^2 u+\operatorname{cl}^2 u}}$$
$$\text{ctlh}(\sqrt{2}\,u) = \cos_{4}(\sqrt{2}\,u) = \operatorname{cl}(u)\sqrt{\frac{\operatorname{sl}^2 u+1}{\operatorname{sl}^2 u+\operatorname{cl}^2 u}}$$

The functional designation sl stands for the lemniscatic sine and the designation cl stands for the lemniscatic cosine. In addition, those relations to the Jacobi elliptic functions are valid:
$$\text{tlh}(u) = \frac{\text{sn}(u;\tfrac{1}{2}\sqrt{2})}{\sqrt[4]{\text{cd}(u;\tfrac{1}{2}\sqrt{2})^4 + \text{sn}(u;\tfrac{1}{2}\sqrt{2})^4}}$$
$$\text{ctlh}(u) = \frac{\text{cd}(u;\tfrac{1}{2}\sqrt{2})}{\sqrt[4]{\text{cd}(u;\tfrac{1}{2}\sqrt{2})^4 + \text{sn}(u;\tfrac{1}{2}\sqrt{2})^4}}$$

When $u$ is real, the derivative and quarter period integral of $\operatorname{tlh}$ and $\operatorname{ctlh}$ can be expressed in this way:

$\frac{\mathrm{d}}{\mathrm{d}u}\operatorname{tlh}(u) = \operatorname{ctlh}(u)^3$

$\frac{\mathrm{d}}{\mathrm{d}u}\operatorname{ctlh}(u) = -\operatorname{tlh}(u)^3$

$\int_{0}^{\varpi/\sqrt{2}} \operatorname{tlh}(u) \,\mathrm{d}u = \frac{\varpi}{2}$

$\int_{0}^{\varpi/\sqrt{2}} \operatorname{ctlh}(u) \,\mathrm{d}u = \frac{\varpi}{2}$

==== Derivation of the Hyperbolic Lemniscate functions ====
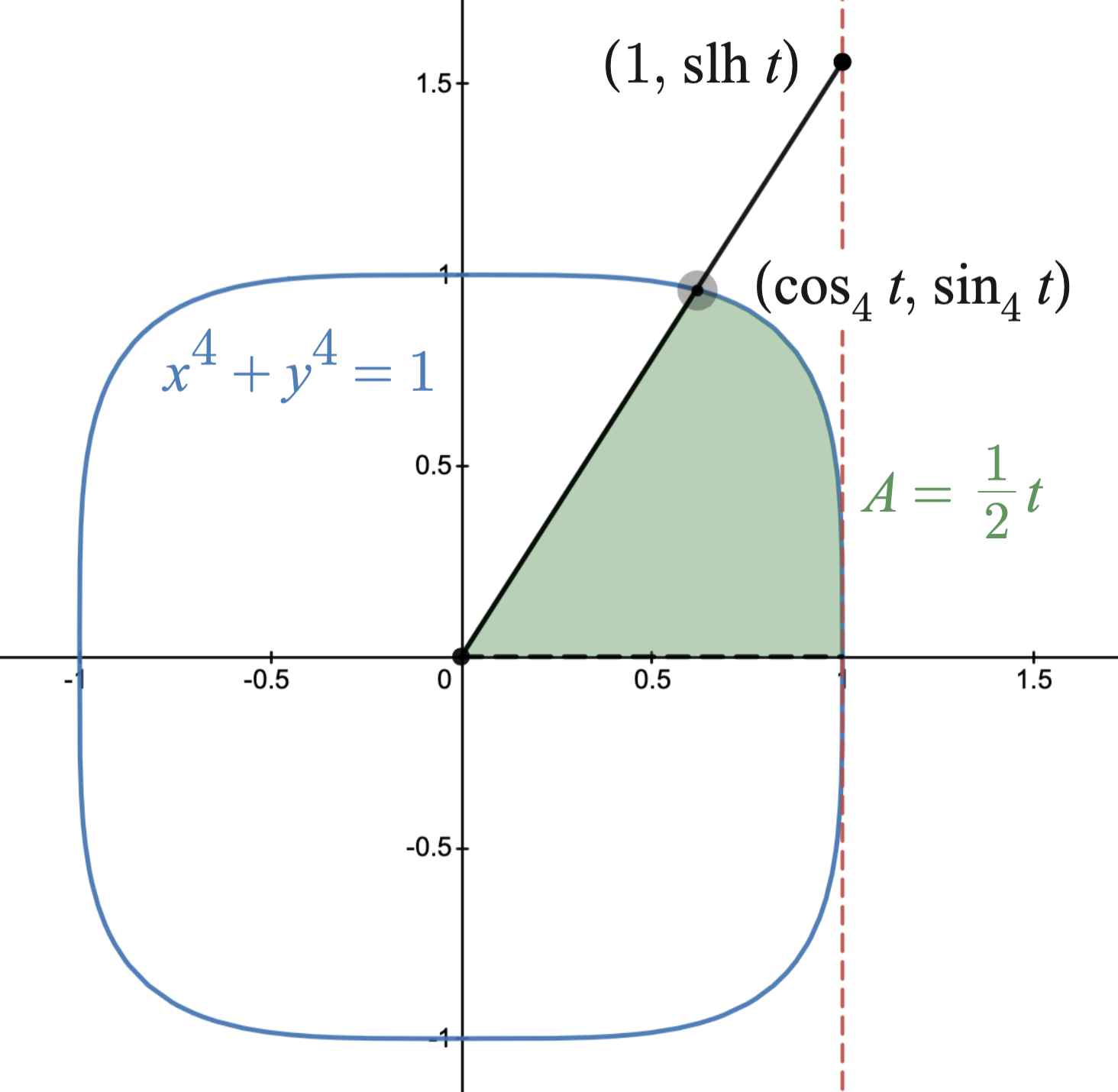
With respect to the quartic Fermat curve x^{4} + y^{4} = 1, the hyperbolic lemniscate sine is analogous to the trigonometric tangent function. Unlike slh and clh, the functions sin_{4} and cos_{4} cannot be analytically extended to meromorphic functions in the whole complex plane.

The horizontal and vertical coordinates of this superellipse are dependent on twice the enclosed area w = 2A, so the following conditions must be met:
$$x(w)^4 + y(w)^4 = 1$$
$$\frac{\mathrm{d}}{\mathrm{d}w} x(w) = -y(w)^3$$
$$\frac{\mathrm{d}}{\mathrm{d}w} y(w) = x(w)^3$$
$$x(w = 0) = 1$$
$$y(w = 0) = 0$$

The solutions to this system of equations are as follows:
$$x(w) = \operatorname{cl}(\tfrac{1}{2}\sqrt{2}w) [\operatorname{sl}(\tfrac{1}{2}\sqrt{2}w)^2+1]^{1/2} [\operatorname{sl}(\tfrac{1}{2}\sqrt{2}w)^2+\operatorname{cl}(\tfrac{ 1}{2}\sqrt{2}w)^2]^{-1/2}$$
$$y(w) = \operatorname{sl}(\tfrac{1}{2}\sqrt{2}w) [\operatorname{cl}(\tfrac{1}{2}\sqrt{2}w)^2+1]^{1/2} [\operatorname{sl}(\tfrac{1}{2}\sqrt{2}w)^2+\operatorname{cl}(\tfrac{ 1}{2}\sqrt{2}w)^2]^{-1/2}$$

The following therefore applies to the quotient:
$$\frac{y(w)}{x(w)} = \frac{\operatorname{sl}(\tfrac{1}{2}\sqrt{2}w) [\operatorname{cl}(\tfrac{1}{2}\sqrt{2}w)^2+1]^{1/2}}{\operatorname{cl}(\tfrac{1}{2}\sqrt{2}w) [ \operatorname{sl}(\tfrac{1}{2}\sqrt{2}w)^2+1]^{1/2}} = \operatorname{slh}(w)$$
The functions x(w) and y(w) are called cotangent hyperbolic lemniscatus and hyperbolic tangent.
$$x(w) = \text{ctlh}(w)$$
$$y(w) = \text{tlh}(w)$$

The sketch also shows the fact that the derivation of the Areasinus hyperbolic lemniscatus function is equal to the reciprocal of the square root of the successor of the fourth power function.

=== Specific values ===
This list shows the values of the Hyperbolic Lemniscate Sine accurately. Recall that,
$$\int_0^\infty \frac{\operatorname{d}t}{\sqrt{t^4 + 1}} = \tfrac14 \Beta\bigl(\tfrac14, \tfrac14\bigr) = \frac{\varpi}{\sqrt2} = \frac{\sigma}{2} = 1.85407\ldots$$
whereas $\tfrac12 \Beta\bigl(\tfrac12, \tfrac12\bigr) = \tfrac{\pi}2,$ so the values below such as ${\operatorname{slh}}\bigl(\tfrac{\varpi}{2\sqrt{2}}\bigr) = {\operatorname{slh}}\bigl(\tfrac{\sigma}{4}\bigr) = 1$ are analogous to the trigonometric ${\sin}\bigl(\tfrac{\pi}2\bigr) = 1$.

$$\operatorname{slh}\,\left(\frac{\varpi}{2\sqrt{2}}\right) = 1$$
$$\operatorname{slh}\,\left(\frac{\varpi}{3\sqrt{2}}\right) = \frac{1}{\sqrt[4]{3}}\sqrt[4]{2\sqrt{3}-3}$$
$$\operatorname{slh}\,\left(\frac{2\varpi}{3\sqrt{2}}\right) = \sqrt[4]{2\sqrt{3}+3}$$
$$\operatorname{slh}\,\left(\frac{\varpi}{4\sqrt{2}}\right) = \frac{1}{\sqrt[4]{2}}(\sqrt{\sqrt{2}+1}-1)$$
$$\operatorname{slh}\,\left(\frac{3\varpi}{4\sqrt{2}}\right) = \frac{1}{\sqrt[4]{2}}(\sqrt{\sqrt{2}+1}+1)$$
$$\operatorname{slh}\,\left(\frac{\varpi}{5\sqrt{2}}\right) = \frac{1}{\sqrt[4]{8}}\sqrt{\sqrt{5}-1}\sqrt{\sqrt[4]{20}-\sqrt{\sqrt{5}+1}} = 2\sqrt[4]{\sqrt{5} - 2}\sqrt{\sin(\tfrac{1}{20}\pi)\sin(\tfrac{3}{20}\pi)}$$
$$\operatorname{slh}\,\left(\frac{2\varpi}{5\sqrt{2}}\right) = \frac{1}{2\sqrt[4]{2}}(\sqrt{5}+1)\sqrt{\sqrt[4]{20}-\sqrt{\sqrt{5}+1}} = 2\sqrt[4]{\sqrt{5} + 2}\sqrt{\sin(\tfrac{1}{20}\pi)\sin(\tfrac{3}{20}\pi)}$$
$$\operatorname{slh}\,\left(\frac{3\varpi}{5\sqrt{2}}\right) = \frac{1}{\sqrt[4]{8}}\sqrt{\sqrt{5}-1}\sqrt{\sqrt[4]{20}+\sqrt{\sqrt{5}+1}} = 2\sqrt[4]{\sqrt{5} - 2}\sqrt{\cos(\tfrac{1}{20}\pi)\cos(\tfrac{3}{20}\pi)}$$
$$\operatorname{slh}\,\left(\frac{4\varpi}{5\sqrt{2}}\right) = \frac{1}{2\sqrt[4]{2}}(\sqrt{5}+1)\sqrt{\sqrt[4]{20}+\sqrt{\sqrt{5}+1}} = 2\sqrt[4]{\sqrt{5} + 2}\sqrt{\cos(\tfrac{1}{20}\pi)\cos(\tfrac{3}{20}\pi)}$$
$$\operatorname{slh}\,\left(\frac{\varpi}{6\sqrt{2}}\right) = \frac{1}{2}(\sqrt{2\sqrt{3}+3}+1)(1-\sqrt[4]{2\sqrt{3}-3})$$
$$\operatorname{slh}\,\left(\frac{5\varpi}{6\sqrt{2}}\right) = \frac{1}{2}(\sqrt{2\sqrt{3}+3}+1)(1+\sqrt[4]{2\sqrt{3}-3})$$

That table shows the most important values of the Hyperbolic Lemniscate Tangent and Cotangent functions:

$z$	$\operatorname{clh} z$	$\operatorname{slh} z$	$\operatorname{ctlh} z = \cos_{4} z$	$\operatorname{tlh} z = \sin_{4} z$
$0$	$\infty$	$0$	$1$	$0$
${\tfrac14}\sigma$	$1$	$1$	$1\big/\sqrt[4]{2}$	$1\big/\sqrt[4]{2}$
${\tfrac12}\sigma$	$0$	$\infty$	$0$	$1$
${\tfrac34}\sigma$	$-1$	$-1$	$-1\big/\sqrt[4]{2}$	$1\big/\sqrt[4]{2}$
$\sigma$	$\infty$	$0$	$-1$	$0$

== Number theory ==
In algebraic number theory, every finite abelian extension of the Gaussian rationals $\mathbb{Q}(i)$ is a subfield of $\mathbb{Q}(i,\omega_n)$ for some positive integer $n$. This is analogous to the Kronecker–Weber theorem for the rational numbers $\mathbb{Q}$ which is based on division of the circle – in particular, every finite abelian extension of $\mathbb{Q}$ is a subfield of $\mathbb{Q}(\zeta_n)$ for some positive integer $n$. Both are special cases of Kronecker's Jugendtraum, which became Hilbert's twelfth problem.

The field $\mathbb{Q}(i,\operatorname{sl}(\varpi /n))$ (for positive odd $n$) is the extension of $\mathbb{Q}(i)$ generated by the $x$- and $y$-coordinates of the $(1+i)n$-torsion points on the elliptic curve $y^2=4x^3+x$.

=== Hurwitz numbers ===
The Bernoulli numbers $\mathrm{B}_n$ can be defined by
$$\mathrm{B}_n
= \lim_{z\to 0}\frac{\mathrm d^n}{\mathrm dz^n}\frac{z}{e^z-1},\quad n\ge 0$$
and appear in
$$\sum_{k\in\mathbb{Z}\setminus\{0\}}\frac{1}{k^{2n}}
= (-1)^{n-1}\mathrm{B}_{2n}\frac{(2\pi)^{2n}}{(2n)!}=2\zeta (2n),\quad n\ge 1$$
where $\zeta$ is the Riemann zeta function.

The Hurwitz numbers $\mathrm{H}_n,$ named after Adolf Hurwitz, are the "lemniscate analogs" of the Bernoulli numbers. They can be defined by
$$\mathrm{H}_n
= -\lim_{z\to 0}\frac{\mathrm d^n}{\mathrm dz^n}z\zeta (z;1/4,0),\quad n\ge 0$$
where $\zeta (\cdot;1/4,0)$ is the Weierstrass zeta function with lattice invariants $1/4$ and $0$. They appear in
$$\sum_{z\in\mathbb{Z}[i]\setminus\{0\}}\frac{1}{z^{4n}}
= \mathrm{H}_{4n}\frac{(2\varpi)^{4n}}{(4n)!}
= G_{4n}(i),\quad n\ge 1$$
where $\mathbb{Z}[i]$ are the Gaussian integers and $G_{4n}$ are the Eisenstein series of weight $4n$, and in
$$\displaystyle \begin{array}{ll}
\displaystyle\sum_{n=1}^\infty\dfrac{n^k}{e^{2\pi n}-1} = \begin{cases}
\dfrac{1}{24}-\dfrac{1}{8\pi}  & {\text{if}}\ k=1 \\
\dfrac{\mathrm{B}_{k+1}}{2k+2} & {\text{if}}\ k\equiv1\, (\mathrm{mod}\, 4)\ {\text{and}}\ k\ge 5 \\
\dfrac{\mathrm{B}_{k+1}}{2k+2}+\dfrac{\mathrm{H}_{k+1}}{2k+2}\left(\dfrac{\varpi}{\pi}\right)^{k+1} & {\text{if}}\ k\equiv 3\,(\mathrm{mod}\,4)\ {\text{and}}\ k\ge 3. \\
\end{cases}
\end{array}$$

The Hurwitz numbers can also be determined as follows: $\mathrm{H}_4=1/10$,
$$\mathrm{H}_{4n}
= \frac{3}{(2n-3)(16n^2-1)}\sum_{k=1}^{n-1}\binom{4n}{4k}(4k-1)(4(n-k)-1)\mathrm{H}_{4k}\mathrm{H}_{4(n-k)},\quad n\ge 2$$
and $\mathrm{H}_n=0$ if $n$ is not a multiple of $4$. This yields
$$\mathrm{H}_8=\frac{3}{10},\,\mathrm{H}_{12}=\frac{567}{130},\,\mathrm{H}_{16}=\frac{43\,659}{170},\,\ldots$$

Also
$$\operatorname{denom}\mathrm{H}_{4n}=\prod_{(p-1)|4n}p$$
where $p\in\mathbb{P}$ such that $p\not\equiv 3\,(\text{mod}\,4),$ just as
$$\operatorname{denom}\mathrm{B}_{2n}=\prod_{(p-1)|2n}p$$
where $p\in\mathbb{P}$ (by the von Staudt–Clausen theorem).

In fact, the von Staudt–Clausen theorem determines the fractional part of the Bernoulli numbers:
$$\mathrm{B}_{2n}+\sum_{(p-1)|2n}\frac{1}{p}\in\mathbb{Z},\quad n\ge 1$$
(sequence A000146 in the OEIS) where $p$ is any prime, and an analogous theorem holds for the Hurwitz numbers: suppose that $a\in\mathbb{Z}$ is odd, $b\in\mathbb{Z}$ is even, $p$ is a prime such that $p\equiv 1\,(\mathrm{mod}\,4)$, $p=a^2+b^2$ (see Fermat's theorem on sums of two squares) and $a\equiv b+1\,(\mathrm{mod}\,4)$. Then for any given $p$, $2a=\nu (p)$ is uniquely determined; equivalently $\nu (p)=p-\mathcal{N}_p$ where $\mathcal{N}_p$ is the number of solutions of the congruence $X^3-X\equiv Y^2\, (\operatorname{mod}p)$ in variables $X,Y$ that are non-negative integers. The Hurwitz theorem then determines the fractional part of the Hurwitz numbers:
$$\mathrm{H}_{4n}-\frac{1}{2}-\sum_{(p-1)|4n}\frac{\nu (p)^{4n/(p-1)}}{p}
\mathrel{\overset{\text{def}}{=}} \mathrm{G}_n\in\mathbb{Z},\quad n\ge 1.$$

The sequence of the integers $\mathrm{G}_n$ starts with $0,-1,5,253,\ldots .$

Let $n\ge 2$. If $4n+1$ is a prime, then $\mathrm{G}_n\equiv 1\,(\mathrm{mod}\,4)$. If $4n+1$ is not a prime, then $\mathrm{G}_n\equiv 3\,(\mathrm{mod}\,4)$.

Some authors instead define the Hurwitz numbers as $\mathrm{H}_n'=\mathrm{H}_{4n}$.

==== Appearances in Laurent series ====
The Hurwitz numbers appear in several Laurent series expansions related to the lemniscate functions:
$$\begin{align}
\operatorname{sl}^2z
&= \sum_{n=1}^\infty \frac{2^{4n}(1-(-1)^{n} 2^{2n})\mathrm{H}_{4n}}{4n}\frac{z^{4n-2}}{(4n-2)!},\quad
\left|z\right|<\frac{\varpi}{\sqrt{2}} \\
\frac{\operatorname{sl}'z}{\operatorname{sl}{z}}
&= \frac{1}{z}-\sum_{n=1}^\infty \frac{2^{4n}(2-(-1)^n 2^{2n})\mathrm{H}_{4n}}{4n}\frac{z^{4n-1}}{(4n-1)!},\quad
\left|z\right|<\frac{\varpi}{\sqrt{2}} \\
\frac{1}{\operatorname{sl}z}
&= \frac{1}{z}-\sum_{n=1}^\infty \frac{2^{2n} ((-1)^n 2-2^{2n})\mathrm{H}_{4n}}{4n}\frac{z^{4n-1}}{(4n-1)!},\quad
\left|z\right|<\varpi \\
\frac{1}{\operatorname{sl}^2z}
&= \frac{1}{z^2}+\sum_{n=1}^\infty \frac{2^{4n}\mathrm{H}_{4n}}{4n}\frac{z^{4n-2}}{(4n-2)!},\quad
\left|z\right|<\varpi
\end{align}$$

Analogously, in terms of the Bernoulli numbers:
$$\frac{1}{\sinh^2 z}
= \frac{1}{z^2}-\sum_{n=1}^\infty \frac{2^{2n}\mathrm{B}_{2n}}{2n}\frac{z^{2n-2}}{(2n-2)!},\quad
\left|z\right|<\pi.$$

=== A quartic analog of the Legendre symbol ===
Let $p$ be a prime such that $p\equiv 1\,(\text{mod}\,4)$. A quartic residue (mod $p$) is any number congruent to the fourth power of an integer. Define $\left(\tfrac{a}{p}\right)_4$ to be $1$ if $a$ is a quartic residue (mod $p$) and define it to be $-1$ if $a$ is not a quartic residue (mod $p$).

If $a$ and $p$ are coprime, then there exist numbers $p'\in\mathbb{Z}[i]$ (see for these numbers) such that
$$\left(\frac{a}{p}\right)_4=\prod_{p'} \frac{\operatorname{sl}(2\varpi ap'/p)}{\operatorname{sl}(2\varpi p'/p)}.$$
This theorem is analogous to
$$\left(\frac{a}{p}\right)=\prod_{n=1}^{\frac{p-1}{2}}\frac{\sin (2\pi a n/p)}{\sin (2\pi n/p)}$$
where $\left(\tfrac{\cdot}{\cdot}\right)$ is the Legendre symbol.

== World map projections ==
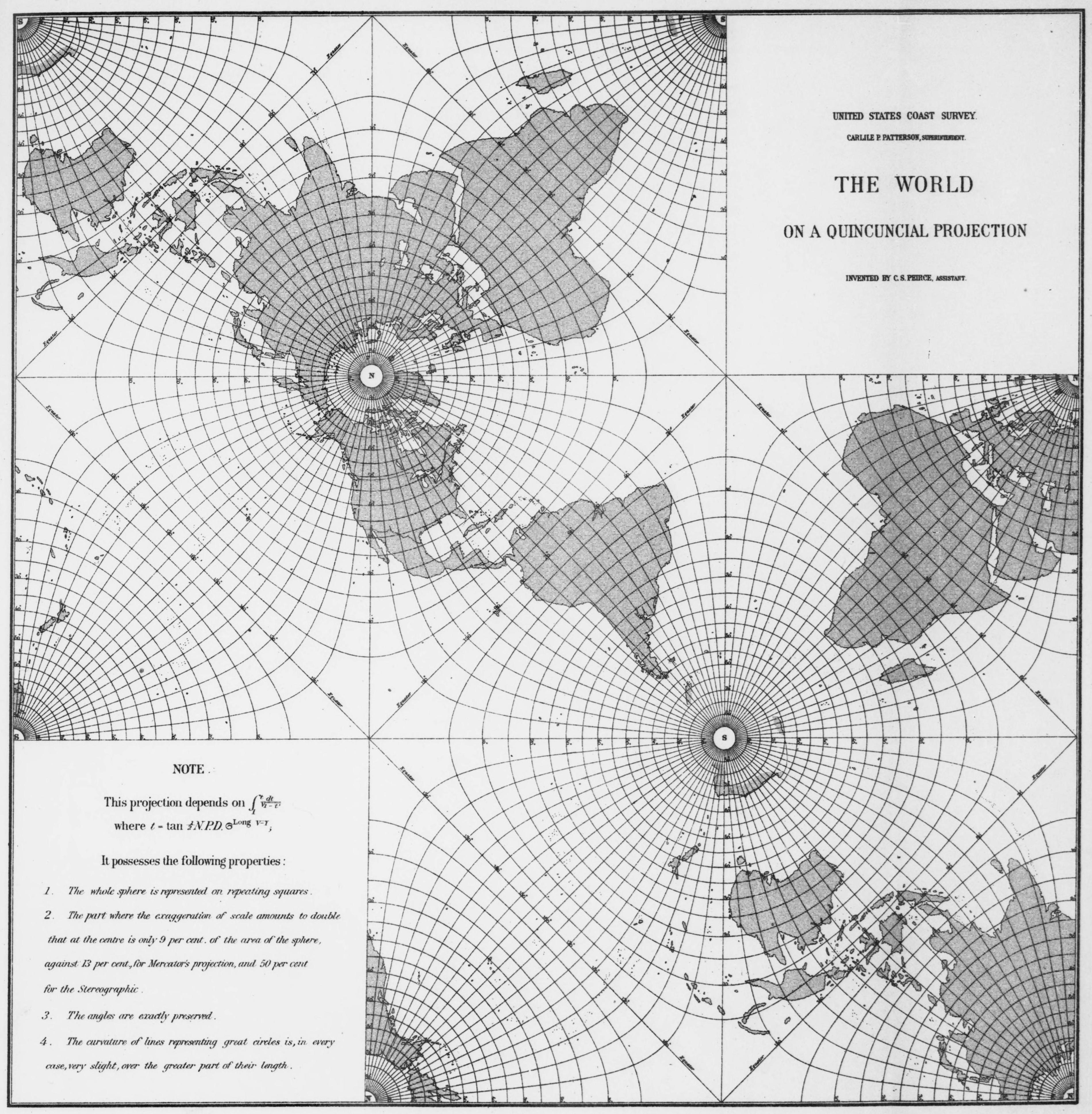
"The World on a Quincuncial Projection", from Peirce (1879).

The Peirce quincuncial projection, designed by Charles Sanders Peirce of the US Coast Survey in the 1870s, is a world map projection based on the inverse lemniscate sine of stereographically projected points (treated as complex numbers).

When lines of constant real or imaginary part are projected onto the complex plane via the hyperbolic lemniscate sine, and thence stereographically projected onto the sphere (see Riemann sphere), the resulting curves are spherical conics, the spherical analog of planar ellipses and hyperbolas. Thus the lemniscate functions (and more generally, the Jacobi elliptic functions) provide a parametrization for spherical conics.

A conformal map projection from the globe onto the 6 square faces of a cube can also be defined using the lemniscate functions. Because many partial differential equations can be effectively solved by conformal mapping, this map from sphere to cube is convenient for atmospheric modeling.

== See also ==
- Elliptic function
  - Abel elliptic functions
  - Dixon elliptic functions
  - Jacobi elliptic functions
  - Weierstrass elliptic function
- Elliptic Gauss sum
- Lemniscate constant
- Peirce quincuncial projection
- Schwarz–Christoffel mapping
