= Polyhedral map projection =

Type of map projection

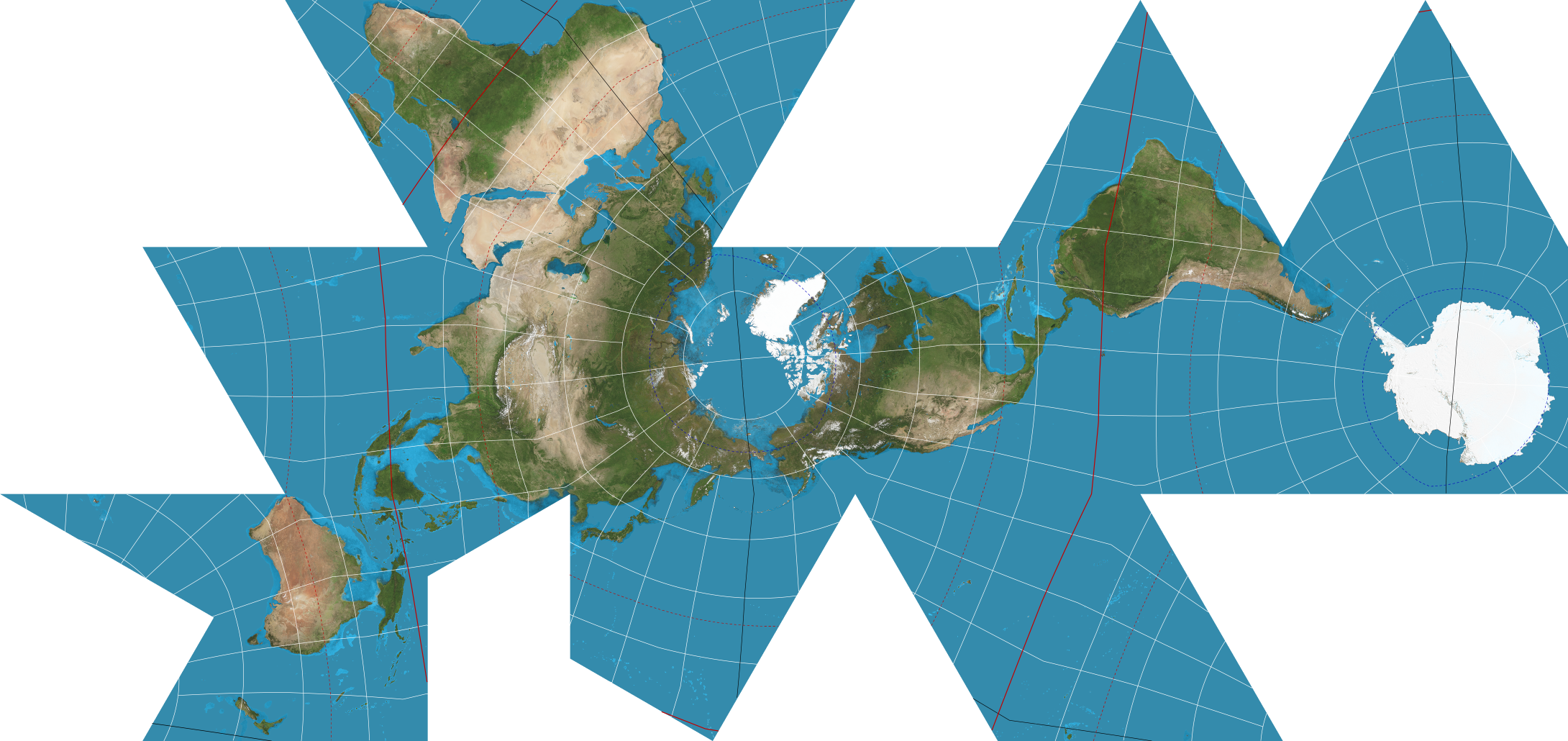
Buckminster Fuller's Dymaxion map

A polyhedral map projection is a map projection based on a spherical polyhedron. Typically, the polyhedron is overlaid on the globe, and each face of the polyhedron is transformed to a polygon or other shape in the plane. The best-known polyhedral map projection is Buckminster Fuller's Dymaxion map. When the spherical polyhedron faces are transformed to the faces of an ordinary polyhedron instead of laid flat in a plane, the result is a polyhedral globe.

Often the polyhedron used is a Platonic solid or Archimedean solid. However, other polyhedra can be used: the AuthaGraph projection makes use of a polyhedron with 96 faces, and the myriahedral projection allows for an arbitrary large number of faces. Although interruptions between faces are common, and more common with an increasing number of faces, some maps avoid them: the Lee conformal projection only has interruptions at its border, and the AuthaGraph projection scales its faces so that the map fills a rectangle without internal interruptions. Some projections can be tesselated to fill the plane, the Lee conformal projection among them.

To a degree, the polyhedron and the projection used to transform each face of the polyhedron can be considered separately, and some projections can be applied to differently shaped faces. The gnomonic projection transforms the edges of spherical polyhedra to straight lines, preserving all polyhedra contained within a hemisphere, so it is a common choice. The Snyder equal-area projection can be applied to any polyhedron with regular faces. The projection used in later versions of the Dymaxion map can be generalized to other equilateral triangular faces, and even to certain quadrilaterals.

Polyhedral map projections are useful for creating discrete global grids, as with the quadrilateralized spherical cube and Icosahedral Snyder Equal Area (ISEA) grids.

== History ==
The earliest known polyhedral projection is the octant projection developed by Leonardo da Vinci or his associate around 1514, which transforms the faces of an octahedron to Reuleaux triangles.

Christian Gottlieb Reichard created a polyhedral globe based on the cube in 1803. An icosahedral globe appeared in 1851. Polyhedral globes cheaply constructed from cardboard were popular for a time in Europe.

Projections based on dihedra begin appearing with the Peirce quincuncial projection in 1879, Guyou hemisphere-in-a-square projection in 1887, and Adams hemisphere-in-a-square projection in 1925. Although the dihedra are not traditional polyhedra they are spherical polyhedra, and the methods used in these projections are also used in other polyhedral projections. In the same work as the hemisphere-in-a-square projection, Adams created maps depicting the entire globe in a rhombus, hexagon, and hexagram.

Bernard J. S. Cahill invented the "butterfly map", based on the octahedron, in 1909. This was generalized into the Cahill–Keyes projection in 1975 and the Waterman butterfly projection in 1996. Cahill's work was also influential on Fuller's Dymaxion maps: Fuller's first version, based on a cuboctahedron, was published in 1943, and his second, based on an icosahedron, was published in 1954.

In 1965, Wellman Chamberlin (also known for his Chamberlin trimetric projection) and Howard E. Paine of the National Geographic Society designed a polyhedral map based on the 12 equal pentagon faces of a dodecahedron. 20 years later, Chamberlin and Paine used that polyhedral map in "Global Pursuit", a board game intended to teach geography to children.

The quadrilateralized spherical cube was devised in 1975 for the Cosmic Background Explorer project.

The Traveller (1977) and GURPS Space (1987) role-playing games use an icosahedral projection for planetary maps with a hexagon grid.

== Gallery ==
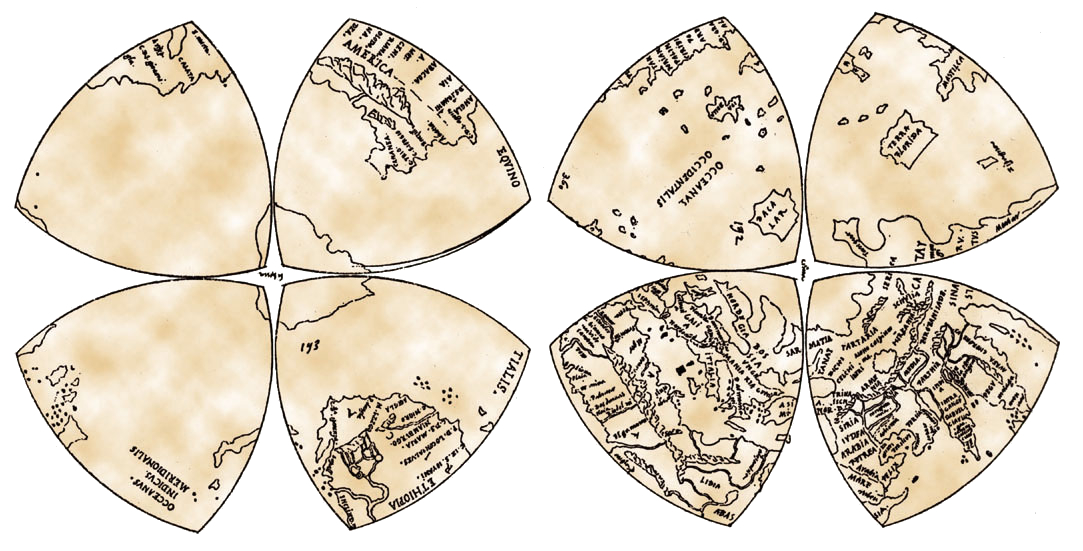
Octant projection

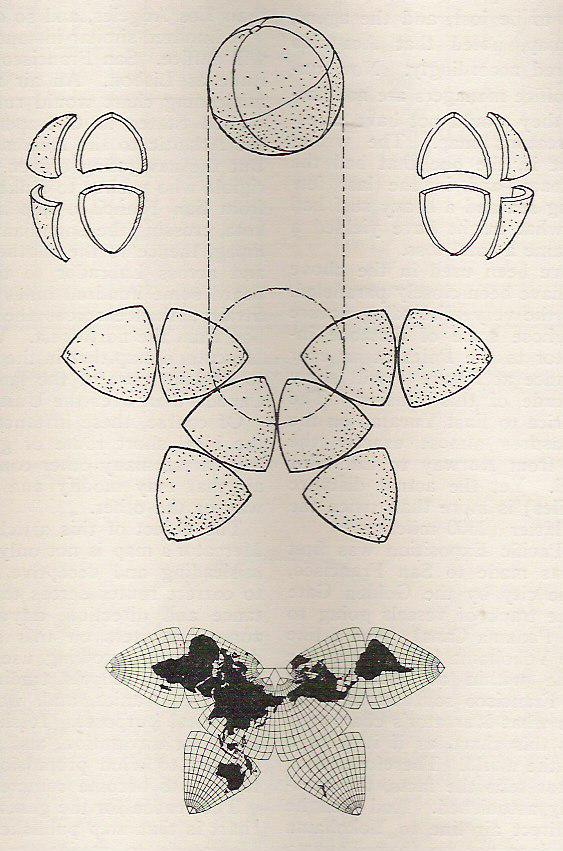
Cahill's butterfly map

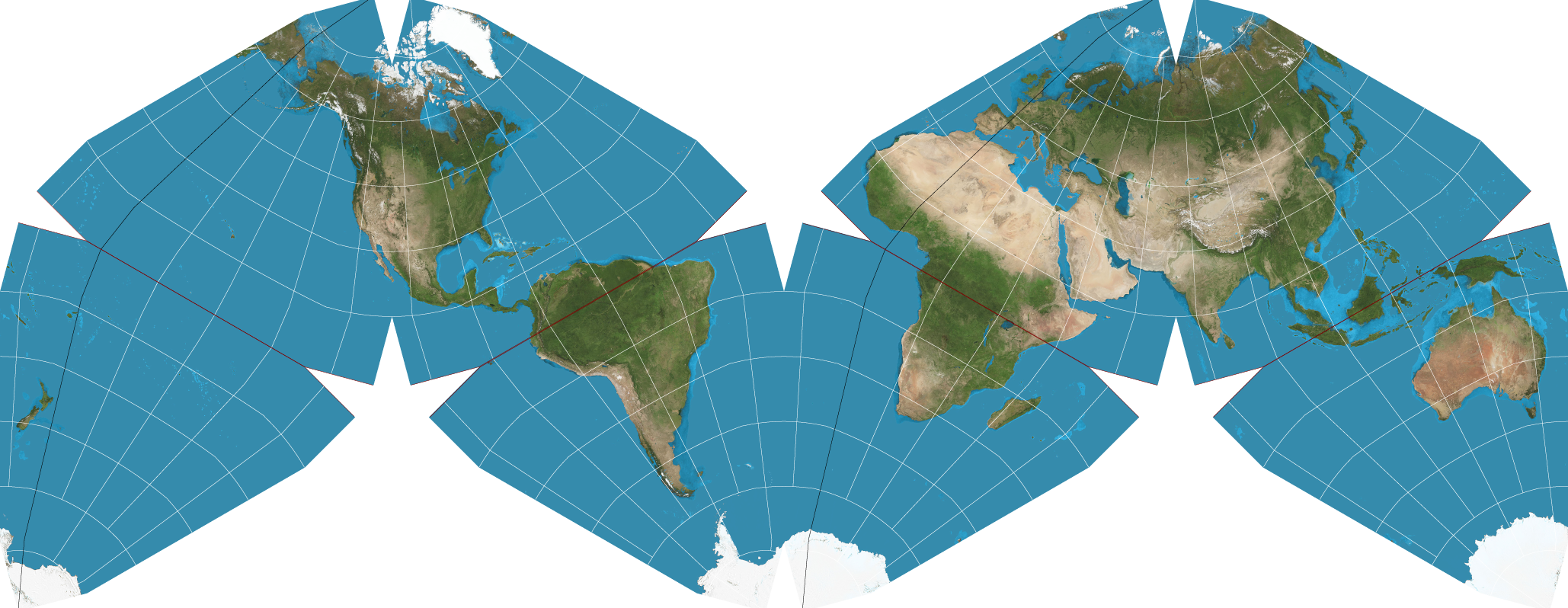
Cahill–Keyes projection

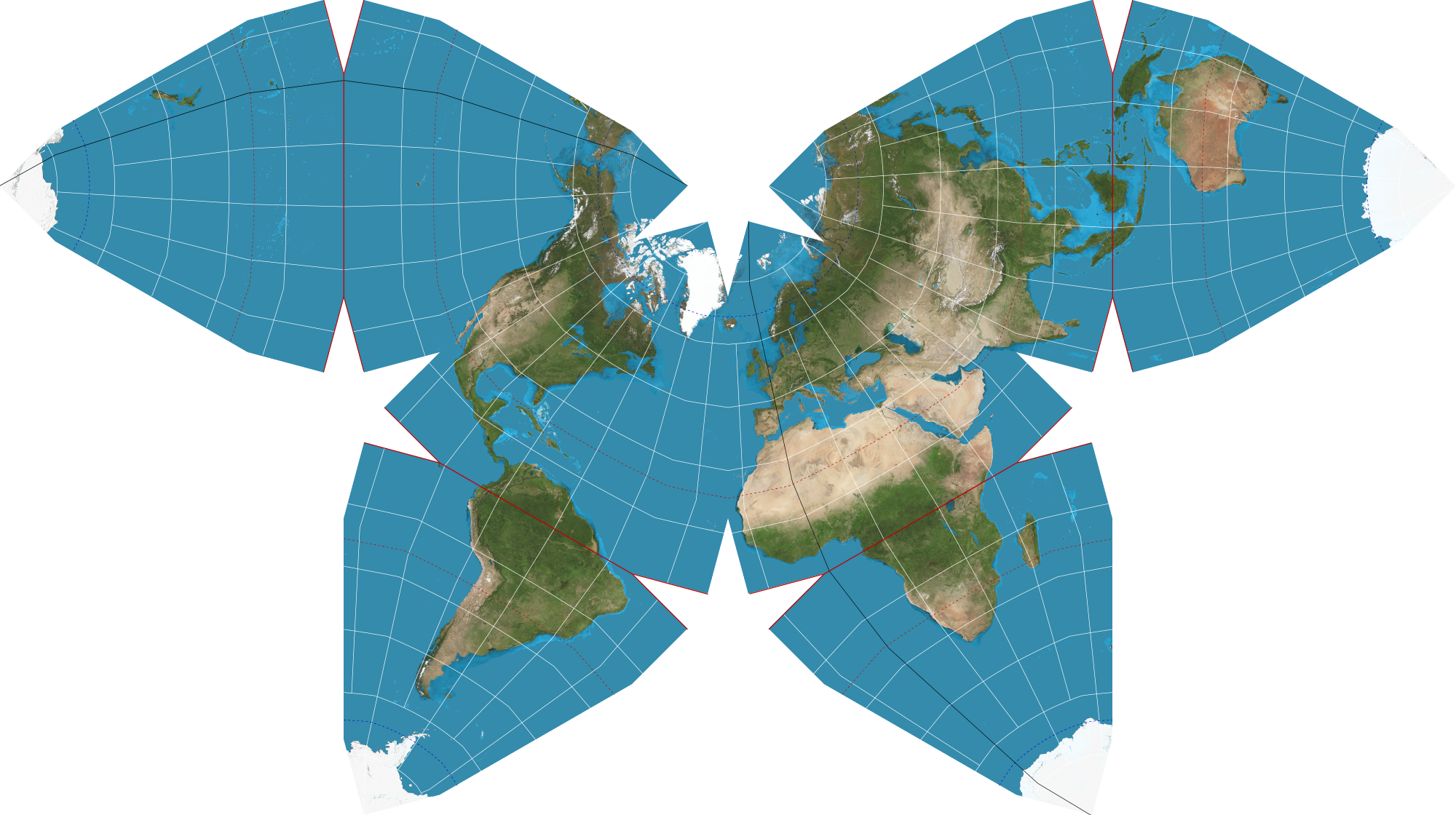
Waterman butterfly projection

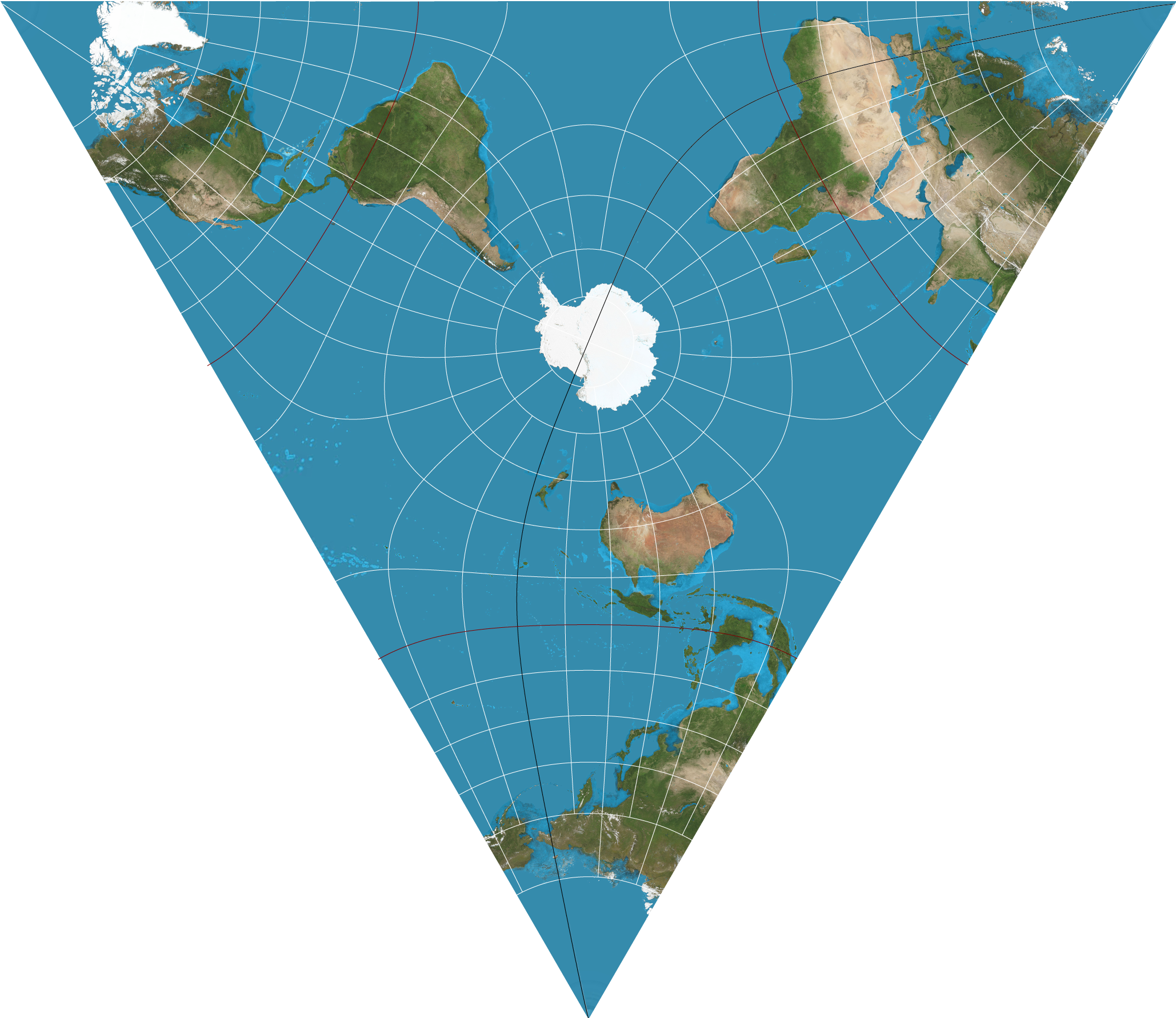
Lee conformal world on a tetrahedron

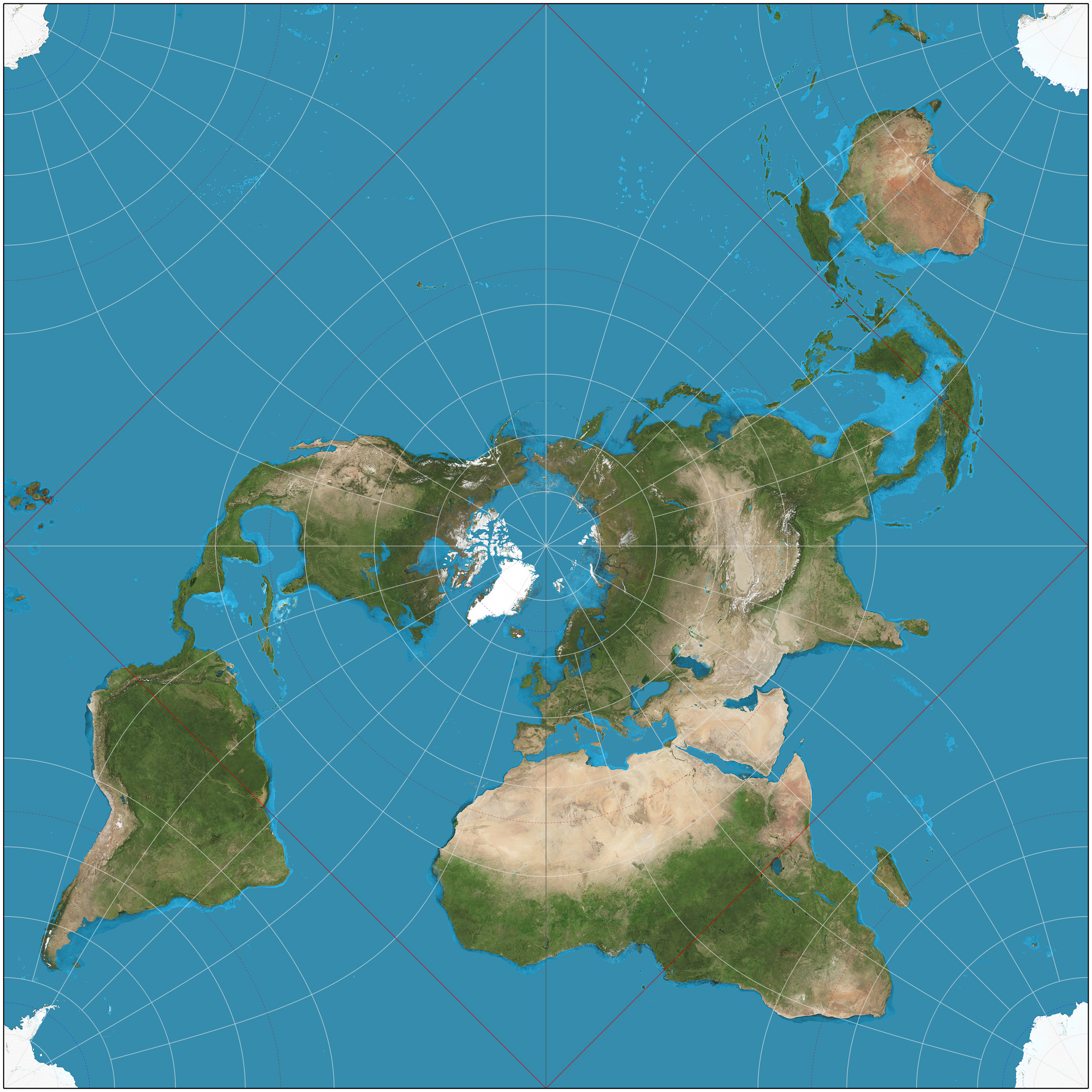
Peirce quincuncial

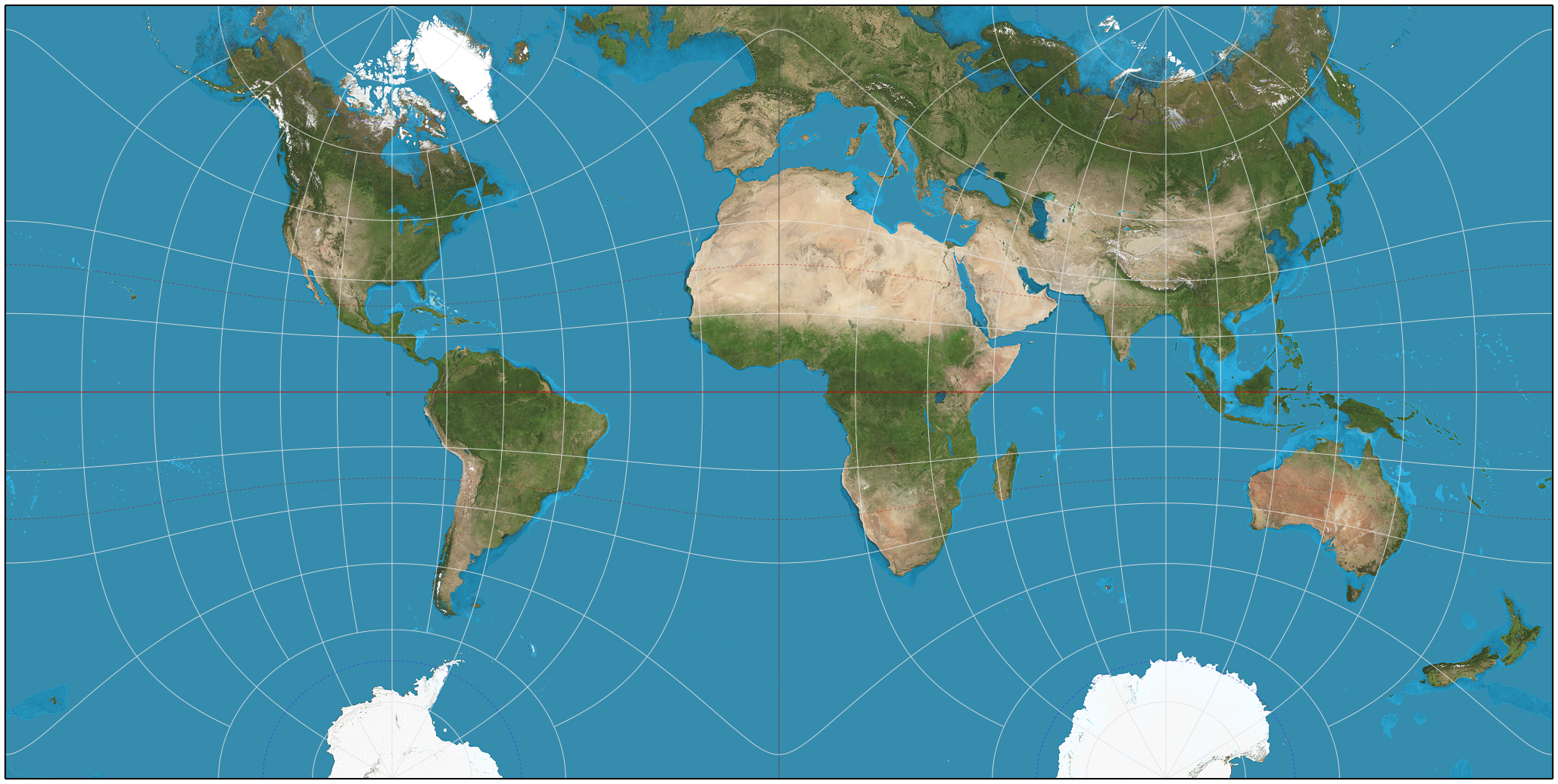
Guyou hemisphere-in-a-square projection

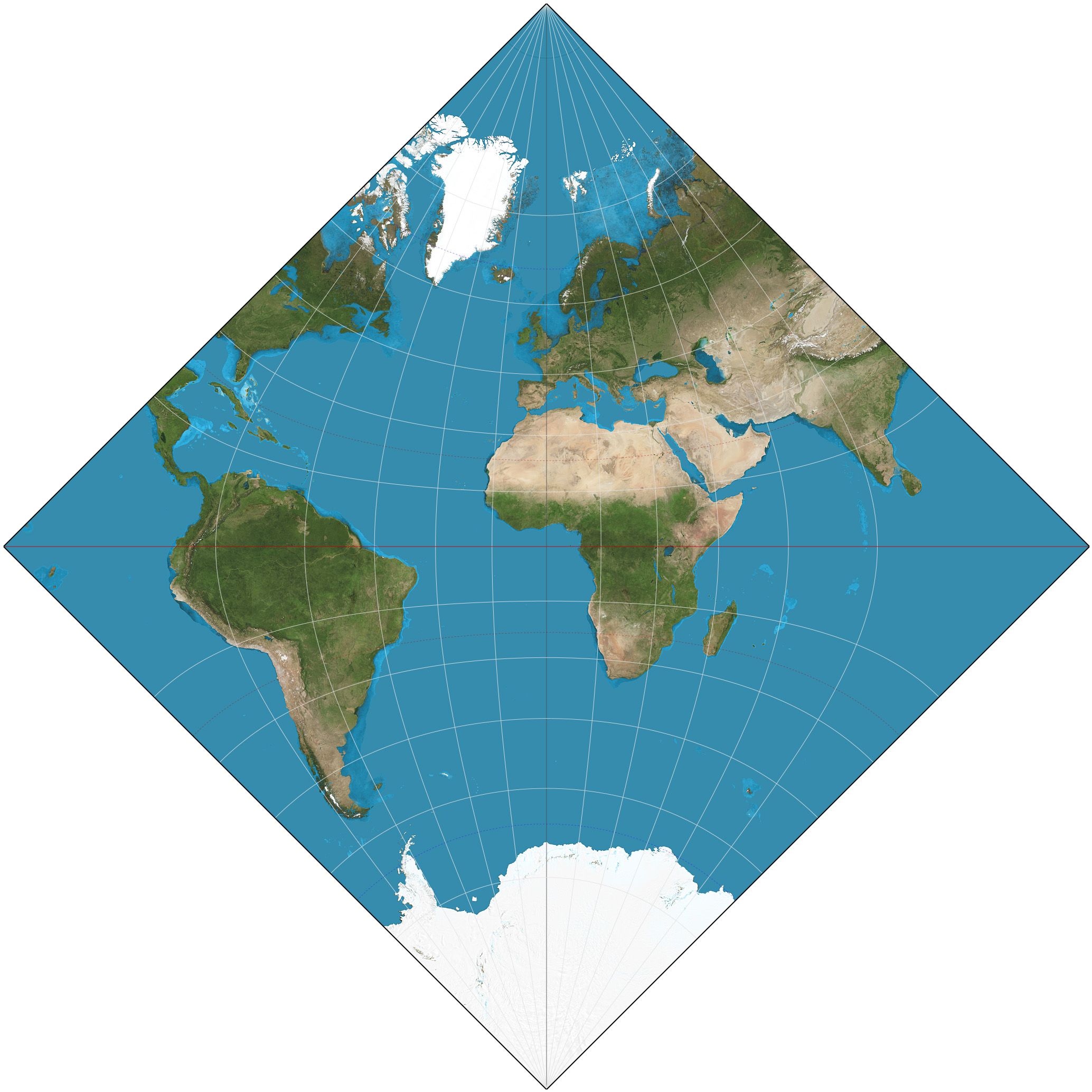
Adams hemisphere-in-a-square projection

== See also ==
- HEALPix, which is not strictly a polyhedral map projection
- List of map projections
