= Cahill–Keyes projection =

Polyhedral compromise map projection

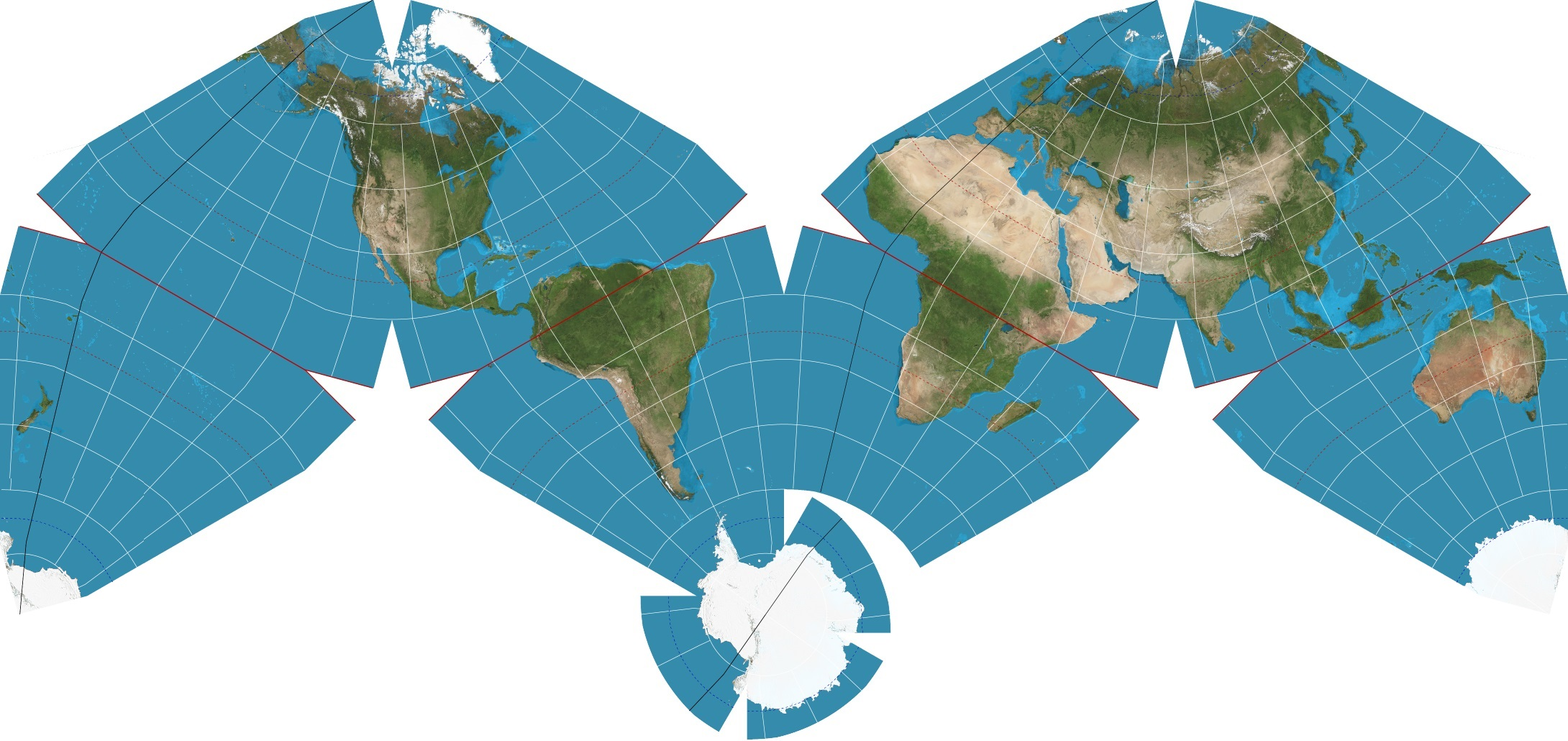
Cahill–Keyes map of the world

The Cahill–Keyes projection with Tissot's indicatrix of deformation

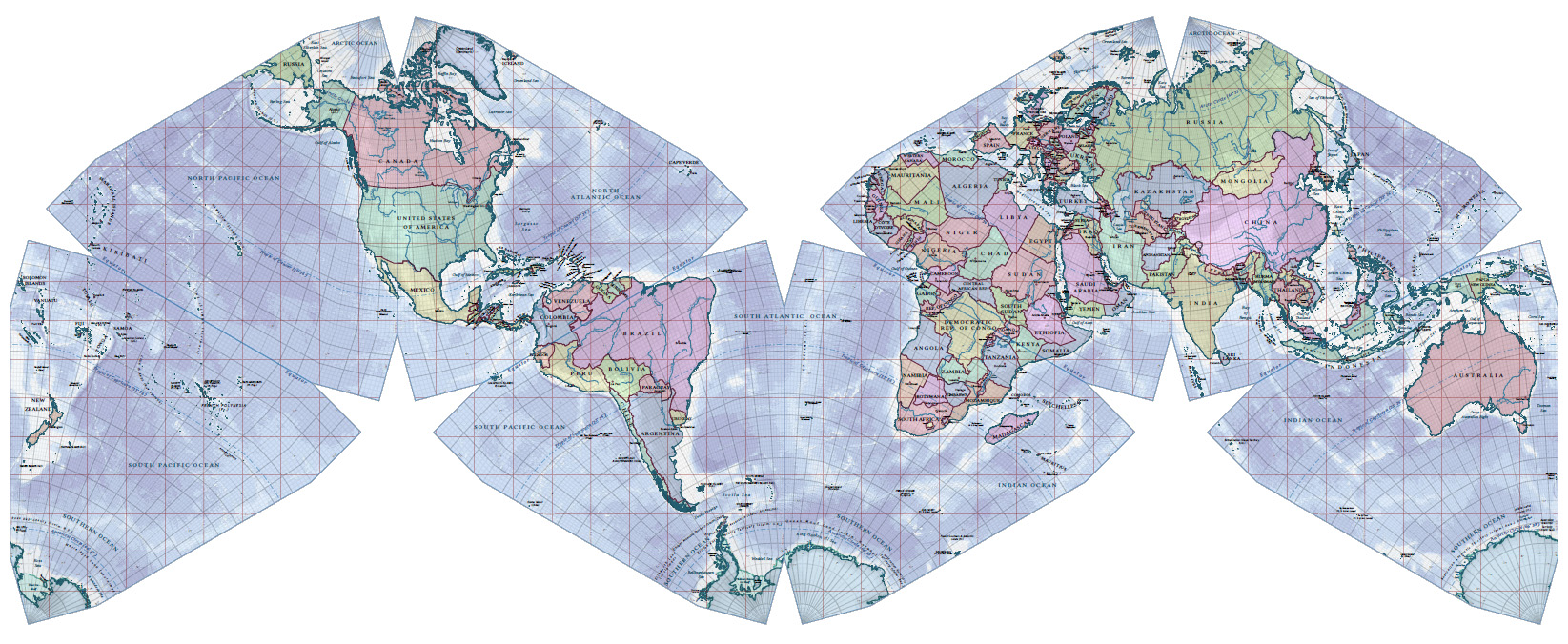
Political World Map for CE 2012 by Duncan Webb using Cahill–Keyes projection

The Cahill–Keyes projection is a polyhedral compromise map projection first proposed by Gene Keyes in 1975. The projection is a refinement of an earlier 1909 projection by Bernard Cahill. The projection was designed to achieve a number of desirable characteristics, namely symmetry of component maps (octants), scalability allowing the map to continue to work well even at high resolution, uniformity of geocells, metric-based joining edges, minimized distortion compared to a globe, and an easily understood orientation to enhance general usability and teachability.

== Construction ==
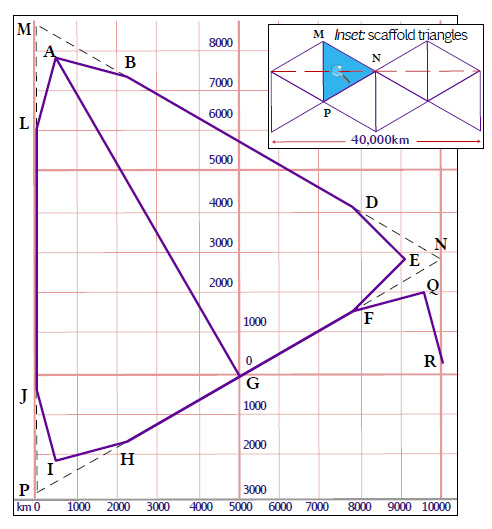
Diagram by Duncan Webb showing the construction of one octant of a Cahill–Keyes projection

The Cahill–Keyes projection was designed with four fundamental considerations in mind: visual fidelity to a globe, proportional geocells, 10,000 km lengths for each of its octants' three main joined edges, and an M-shape Master-Map profile. The resulting map comprises 8 octants. Each octant is an equilateral triangle with three segments per side. One side runs along the equator, and the other two run along meridians. The total length of each side is 10,043 km. The inner meridians converge towards the pole. Each 1° and 5° "tile" is proportional to each other. The specific process for constructing the graticule divides each half-octant into twelve zones, each of which has different formulae for coordinate calculations.

== See also ==
- Cartography
- World map
- Map projection
- List of map projections
- Dymaxion map
- Bernard J. S. Cahill
- Octant projection
