= AuthaGraph projection =

Polyhedral compromise map projection

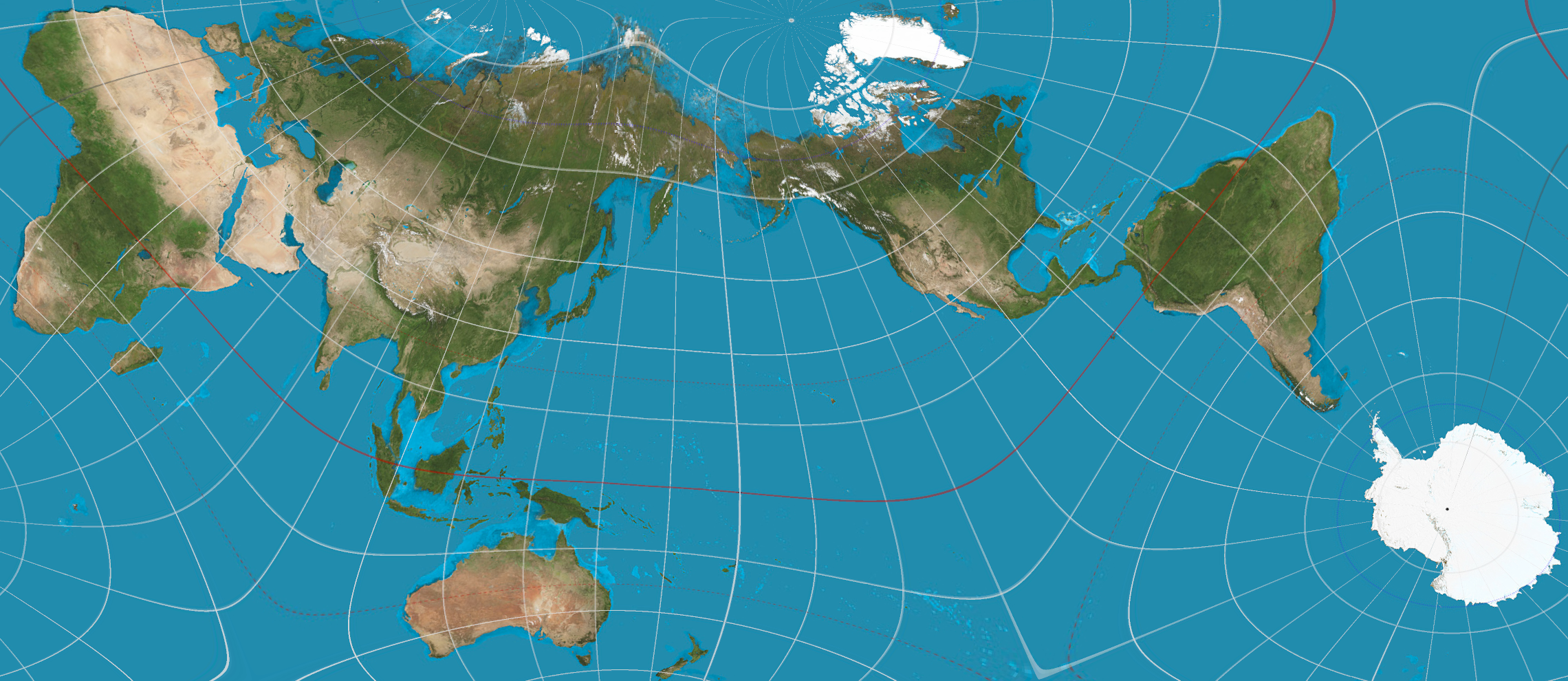
An approximation of the AuthaGraph projection

AuthaGraph is an approximately equal-area world map projection invented by Japanese architect Hajime Narukawa in 1999. The map is made by equally dividing a spherical surface into 96 triangles, transferring it to a tetrahedron while maintaining area proportions, and unfolding it in the form of a rectangle: it is a polyhedral map projection. The map reduces the distortion of sizes and shapes of all continents and oceans, as inspired by the Dymaxion map. The projection does not have some of the major distortions of the Mercator projection, like the expansion of countries in far northern latitudes, and allows for Antarctica to be displayed accurately and in whole. Triangular world maps are also possible using the same method. The name is derived from "authalic" and "graph".

The method used to construct the projection ensures that the 96 regions of the sphere that are used to define the projection each have the correct area, but the projection does not qualify as equal-area because the method does not control area at infinitesimal scales or even within those regions.

The AuthaGraph world map can be tiled in any direction without visible seams. From this map-tiling, a new world map with triangular, rectangular or a parallelogram's outline can be framed with various regions at its center. This tessellation allows for depicting temporal themes, such as a satellite's long-term movement around the Earth in a continuous line.

In 2011 the AuthaGraph mapping projection was selected by the Japanese National Museum of Emerging Science and Innovation (Miraikan) as its official mapping tool. In October 2016, the AuthaGraph mapping projection won the 2016 Good Design Grand Award from the Japan Institute of Design Promotion.

On April 16, 2024, Nebraska Governor Jim Pillen signed a law that requires public schools to use only maps based on the Gall–Peters projection, a similar cylindrical equal-area projection, or the AuthaGraph projection, beginning in the 2024–2025 school year.

== See also ==
- List of map projections
- Lee conformal world in a tetrahedron, another tetrahedral projection, 1965
- Dymaxion map, 1943
- Peirce quincuncial projection, 1879
- Polyhedral map projection, earliest known is by Leonardo da Vinci, 1514
