= Hajime Narukawa =

Japanese architect (born 1971)

- Born: 1971 (age 54–55); Kawasaki, Kanagawa Prefecture, Japan
- Education: Berlage Institute
- Occupation: Architect
- Design: AuthaGraph projection

Hajime Narukawa (鳴川肇, Narukawa Hajime) is a Japanese architect. He was born in 1971 in Kawasaki, Kanagawa and lives and practices in Tokyo.

== Biography ==
Narukawa graduated in 1994 from the Shibaura Institute of Technology, Tokyo National University of Fine Arts with a master's degree in 1996, and the Berlage Institute in Rotterdam with a master's degree in 1999. In 1994 his "Golden Gai Theater" won the Gold Medal in the Japan Institute of Architects competition for newly graduated architects. In the same year he began his research on geometrical theory. In 1996 his "Tensegrity Modeling Manual" was awarded the Salon de Printemps Prize.

Narukawa founded AuthaGraph Co., Ltd in 2009, after working at the Arnhem Academy of Architecture, and Sasaki Structural Consultants. Since 2015, he is an associate professor at Keio University, Tokyo in the Environment and Information department.

== Work ==
Narukawa is the inventor of AuthaGraph, a unique world map projection, that is loosely based on Buckminster Fuller's Dymaxion map. Narukawa had designed a simplified tensegrity modeling manual which he presented in his master thesis 'Tensegrity Modeling Manual' in 1996. The manual enables the construction of tensegrity structural models without complicated calculations or difficult fabrication techniques by a single person. A summary of the manual is publicly available for download. The AuthaGraph projection method can convert an omnidirectional view and a full spherical image, such as a globe, on a rectangular flat display without gaps and overlaps. In 2011 the AuthaGraph mapping projection was selected by the Japanese National Museum of Emerging Science and innovation (Miraikan) as its official mapping tool.

Narukawa has received several patents for the AuthaGraph projection method.

== Awards ==
- Gold Medal in the Japan Institute of Architects competition for newly graduated architects for "Golden Gai Theater" (1994)
- Salon de Printemps Prize (1996) for "Tensegrity Modeling Manual"
