= Build the Earth =

Collaborative Minecraft project recreating Earth at 1:1 scale

BuildTheEarth (BTE)
- Type of project: Collaborative Minecraft building project
- Founder: PippenFTS
- Established: March 2020; 6 years ago
- Website: buildtheearth.net

BuildTheEarth (BTE) is a collaborative project whose objective is to recreate the planet Earth at a 1:1 scale within the sandbox video game Minecraft. Founded in March 2020 by YouTuber PippenFTS, the project is developed by a global community of volunteers organised into regional and national teams responsible for accurately reproducing real-world locations using publicly available geographic data and reference imagery.

Since its creation, BuildTheEarth has grown into one of the largest collaborative construction projects in Minecraft, with contributors working on cities, infrastructure and landmarks across every inhabited continent.

== History ==
Aerial render of the Build the Earth project on a modified Airocean World Map

BuildTheEarth was created by YouTuber PippenFTS in March 2020 as a collaborative effort to recreate Earth in the video game Minecraft. During the COVID-19 lockdowns, the server aimed to provide players with the opportunity to virtually experience and construct the world. In a YouTube video, PippenFTS called for prospective participants to recreate man-made structures over a rudimentary model of Earth's terrain. A Discord server created to help coordinate the project attracted over a hundred thousand users by April 2020. PippenFTS left the project entirely in 2024, but the project is still actively maintained by the community.

Following unsuccessful attempts to generate terrain using a Mercator projection, organizers opted for a modified version of the Dymaxion map projection. The alternative approach prioritized minimizing distortions in land masses, at the cost of highly distorted oceans.

Minecraft developer Mojang Studios featured the project on their website on Earth Day (April 22), 2020. In July 2020, YouTuber MrBeast released a video where he and 50 other people built his hometown of Raleigh, North Carolina within the project.

In 2020, a full sized recreation of the Taj Mahal was completed on the server by Daniel Tan. In 2022, a team of over 2,000 players constructed a recreation of many places in New York City on a 1:1 scale, including many famous sites such as the 9/11 memorial, New York County Supreme Court, St. Patrick's Cathedraland Soho. A team of over 400 players has completed construction on multiple buildings from Portugal, including the Algarve International Circuit. Another example from elsewhere in the world is Stawiszyn – the first city to be 100% planned and built from scratch in the game (completed in 2025).

== Software ==
Originally, the project primarily depends on two Minecraft modifications to function: Cubic Chunks and Terra++. Cubic Chunks removes Minecraft's limitation on building structures beyond a certain height. Terra++ uses information from geographic data services, such as OpenStreetMap, to automatically generate terrain to ease the building process.

However, with the introduction of new world height limits in Minecraft version 1.18, more regions around the world can fit into the vanilla range. As of 2025, the majority of the project has shifted to Minecraft 1.20+, with no modifications except for parts of the US and South America.
