= Paddy Griffith =

British military theorist and historian

Paddy Griffith (4 February 1947, Liverpool, England – 25 June 2010) was a British military theorist and historian, who authored numerous books in the field of War Studies. He was also a wargame designer for the UK Ministry of Defence, and a leading figure in the wargaming community.

== Academic life ==
Griffith was a freelance military historian and a prolific author on military history and tactics. He was educated at Corpus Christi College, Oxford, where he obtained a first-class honours degree in Modern History. He was a lecturer and then senior lecturer at RMA Sandhurst from 1973 to 1989.

=== Forward into Battle ===
In Forward into Battle: Fighting Tactics from Waterloo to Vietnam (1981), Griffith put forward ideas about the "empty battlefield" or how increased fire-power had led to military formations becoming increasingly disaggregated. The conclusion he drew was that the willingness to close with the enemy was a key factor. It proved to be a highly influential work.

== Wargames ==
Griffith was the founder of the Wargame Developments Group and SMATS (South Manchester Tactical Society) which is a reincarnation of the Manchester Tactical Society founded by Spenser Wilkinson in the 1880s. He was the author of numerous books in the field of War Studies and a wargame designer for the UK Ministry of Defence.

=== Wargames Developments and COW ===
In 1980 while still a lecturer in War Studies at RMA Sandhurst, Griffith organised a conference, "New Directions in Wargaming", held at Moor Park, Farnham, which lasted an entire weekend (23–25 May 1980). He was the primary force behind the foundation of Wargame Developments, a group consisting of professional military personnel, civil servants, educators, and both professional and amateur wargame designers. Since 1981, the Conference of Wargamers (COW) have been held at Knuston Hall Residential College for Adult Education. The typical COW consists of presentations in the form of papers and lectures, workshops, and practical sessions.

Beginning in November 1980, the Wargame Developments group has published a regular journal, The Nugget. Currently there are nine issues distributed annually. It is subscribed to by a wide range of people, including professional military personnel and civilians. Griffith edited the first 15 issues, as well as the 50th.

Griffith is credited with developing the megagame role-playing system.

=== Death ===
Griffith died of a heart attack on 25 June 2010, aged 63.

== Publications ==
=== Works ===
- French Artillery 1800–1815 (1976)
- Napoleonic Wargaming for Fun (1980; revised 2008)
- Forward into Battle: Fighting Tactics from Waterloo to Vietnam (1981)
- A Book of Sandhurst Wargames (1982)
- Not Over by Christmas (1983)
- Wellington-Commander: the Iron Duke's Generalship (1985)
- Rally Once Again (1986)
- Battle in the Civil War: Generalship and Tactics in America 1861–65 (1986)
- Military Thought in the French Army 1815–51 (1989)
- Battle Tactics of the Civil War (1989) – a revised edition of Rally Once Again that was published in America
- Armoured Warfare (1990) – Chapter entitled "British Armoured Warfare in the Western Desert 1940–1943"
- America Invades (1991)
- How to Play Historical War Council Games (1991)
- The Ultimate Weaponry (1991)
- Forward into Battle: Fighting Tactics from Waterloo to the near Future (1992) – a revised edition of Forward into Battle: Fighting Tactics from Waterloo to Vietnam
- Battle Tactics on the Western Front 1916–18 (1994)
- The Battle of Blore Heath, 1459 (1995)
- The Viking Art of War (1995)
- British Fighting Methods on the Western Front (1996)
- Verification 1995: Arms Control, Peacekeeping and the Environment (1995) – Chapter entitled "The Body Bag as Deterrent and Peace Dividend"
- Verification 1996: Arms Control, Peacekeeping and the Environment (1996) – Chapter entitled "The Military Need for Contact Mines"
- Passchendaele in Perspective: the Third Battle of Ypres (1997) – Chapter entitled "The tactical problem: infantry, artillery and the salient"
- The Art of War of Revolutionary France, 1789–1802 (1998)
- British Fighting Methods in the Great War (1998)
- The Peninsular War: Aspects of the Struggle for the Iberian Peninsula (1998)
- A History of the Peninsular War, Vol.IX, Modern Studies of the war in Spain and Portugal, 1808–1814 (1999)
- The Napoleon Options: Alternate decisions of the Napoleonic Wars (2000)
- Battle Tactics of the American Civil War (2001)
- Fortifications of the Western Front 1914–18 (2004)
- The Vauban Fortifications of France (2006)
- French Napoleonic Infantry Tactics 1792–1815 (2007)
- World War II Desert Tactics (2008)
- The Great War on the Western Front: A Short History (2008)
- Sprawling Wargames Multiplayer Wargaming (2009)
