= World Game =

Educational simulation game

World Game, sometimes called the World Peace Game, is an educational simulation developed by Buckminster Fuller to help create solutions to overpopulation and the uneven distribution of global resources. This alternative to war games uses Fuller's Dymaxion map and requires a group of players to cooperatively solve a set of metaphorical scenarios, thus challenging the dominant nation-state perspective with a more holistic "total world" view. The idea was to "make the world work for 100% of humanity in the shortest possible time through spontaneous cooperation without ecological damage or disadvantage to anyone," thus increasing the quality of life for all people.

== History and use ==
The history of the World Game has conflicting origins. Fuller was influenced by his studies of war games at the Naval War College, though the Los Angeles Times also says he developed the idea in reaction to extensive news coverage of the Pentagon's war games. Development appeared to have begun in the late 1940s according to the Schumacher Center. However, Fuller is also said to have originated the idea in 1927, and proposed it in 1961 and 1964 (as a public activity for the U.S. pavilion, later known as the Montreal Biosphere, at the 1967 International and Universal Exposition in Montreal, Canada—which the U.S. Information Agency rejected). The Los Angeles Times says he publicly proposed the concept in "the late 1960s". In any case, Fuller and artist John McHale intended to implement the World Game as the core curriculum at the (then-new) Southern Illinois University Carbondale in 1967, and founded the World Resources Inventory, an institute responsible for conducting the research required for the game launch.

In a preamble to World Game documents for the curriculum released in 1971, Fuller identified it very closely with his "Guinea Pig 'B' experiment" and his "Comprehensive Anticipatory Design Science" lifework. He claimed intellectual property rights as well to control what he considered to be misapplication of his idea by others. He also claimed he had been playing it "longhand" without the assistance of computers since 1927. Nevertheless, Fuller's proposal imagined "a vast computerized network that could process, map, and visualize environmental information drawn from, among other sources, Russian and American spy satellites. Fuller claimed that their optical sensors and thermographic scanners could detect the location and quantity of water, grain, metals, livestock, human populations, or any other conceivable form of energy." The Game would, according to Fuller, transcend human perception's limits in the electromagnetic spectrum, and allow a rich dataset of global environmental trends.

Over fifty hours from June 12 to July 31, 1969, Fuller and 27 grad students from a variety of disciplines met on the court of the New York Studio School of Drawing, Painting and Sculpture, to play the first instance of the World Game, the goal being to end energy poverty by giving all the world population 2000 gigawatt-hours per person per year by 1980; the final strategy revolved around constructing more hydropower. Footage was captured by Herbert Matter for the documentary The World Game.

In 1972, the World Game Institute was founded in Philadelphia, Pennsylvania, by Fuller, Medard Gabel, Howard J. Brown and others.

In 1980, the World Game Institute and the World Resources Inventory published the World Energy Data Sheet. The World Energy Data Sheet compiled a nation by nation summary of energy production, resources, and consumption. The information was compiled in tables and map formats. The project was researched by Seth Snyder and overseen by Medard Gabel. The work was used during a World Game in Philadelphia, in the summer of 1980.

By 1993, the World Game Institute developed and sold an educational software package called Global Recall, which contained global data, maps, an encyclopedia of world problems, and tools for developing solutions to world problems. The package was a computer-based simulation game intended for use by high school and college students in learning about world problems and how to solve them.

In 2001, a for-profit educational company named o.s. Earth Inc. purchased the principal assets of the World Game Institute and offered a Global Simulation Workshop that is a "direct descendant of Buckminster Fuller's famous World Game." In 2019, the company transferred its assets to the Schumacher Center for New Economics.

In 2021, Gabel's new organization, the Global Solutions Lab, announced their own revamp of the World Game, titled WorldGame 2.0.

== Format ==
Organizers of a World Game session have a large amount of discretion over the format. The original 1969 workshop version ran for at least fifty hours from June 12 to July 31, and involved 28 people including Fuller. However, versions of the World Game exist with durations ranging from as long as an academic semester (e.g. the 1967 Southern Illinois University curriculum), to one day (as offered by the group We R One World), to four to six hours (as carried out by the University of California, San Diego in 1995, to mark the centenary of Fuller's birth) to as short as four hours (as offered by the Global Solutions Lab), and with total player amounts ranging from 15 to hundreds.

The Southern Illinois University curriculum, written by Fuller, does not describe its procedures as rules, but rather as "rudimentary" guidelines. Each World Game session has an overarching goal, from ending energy poverty (the original workshop's goal, met by allowing each person on Earth 2 gigawatt-hours per year through increased hydropower), to improving transportation, to ending world hunger, ending illiteracy, building world peace, and solving climate change. Players adopt "handicaps" tied to the session goal as necessary; for example, the UCSD session involved the representatives of regions with the lowest literacy rates being barred from speaking or asking questions. All players must work together, ostensibly as one common team (though organizers often opt to split them into smaller teams), to develop strategies for meeting this goal using the latest data, preferably in as short a time or as efficiently as possible—an analogous board game format would be cooperative gameplay, while an analogous video game format would be cooperative within real-time strategy setting. The setting, with its many players and large scale, is similar to the concept of the megagame. The end product is left vague in Fuller's document, but might take the form of a written report.

Fuller proposed one model for how the World Game would be played farther in the future: after a week of studying a given problem, the players would partake in three rounds of peer review and negotiations. Colleague Medard Gabel described Fuller's vision as follows, using the example of world hunger:

The team or individual that demonstrated how, using current technology and known resources, hunger could be eliminated in ten years, would "win". The team that could show how it could be done in a shorter time, or by using less resources, or costing less, or accomplishing more than one thing at a time, such as providing clean water as well as eliminating malnutrition, would win round 2. Round 3 would be won by an effort that was even "better". The next week the focus would shift to energy, or health or education. Eventually the focus would return to food. These efforts, as pointed out above, were not intended as academic exercises. Each new strategy that incrementally improved the method for solving a problem was one step closer to implementation in Fuller's view.

The company o.s. Earth, which held the intellectual property for the licensed World Game version, formatted its 2000s sessions thusly: 10 teams of randomly selected players representing each region of the world were obligated to form negotiation strategies for the sake of their 'constituents', the people, with the aim of meeting five smaller objectives in human rights, technology, environment, education and health and food. There were also eight teams representing facilitators: four role-played executives of fictional for-profit mega-corporations as stand-ins for the private sectors of some regions, while four represented analogs of the World Health Organization, UNESCO, UN Environment Programme, and UN Commission on Human Rights that "sold" strategies. The remaining two teams represented the United Nations' principal organs and aid programs, and the world's news media, which would report live on the Game's progress. Most of the action in the game centered on three 20-minute rounds of trade negotiations to ensure that all teams' needs were met, with a few dozen minutes at the end set aside for reflection. The timespan simulated was thirty years. Points were scored based on the sum of solutions cards and currency, with very high-development regions such as Europe, Northern America and Japan starting out at about 110-140 points.

== Resources ==
A universal feature of all World Game sessions is the use of an extremely large Dymaxion map of the world, typically within a 70-foot-by-35-foot rectangle on a surface such as a basketball court. This projection is intended to depict the world's landmasses and population without reinforcing cultural perceptions of the Global North and Global South divide, and while balancing accurate representation of landmass shapes with that of land areas.

Players of the World Game are usually given huge collections of data in the form of documents from the United Nations, world atlases, and the organizers (in the Southern Illinois University curriculum, from Fuller's own World Design Science Decade series). These documents can list data ranging from material inputs, production numbers and inventory sizes, to population sizes, numbers of important institutions such as news outlets, and other such statistics as needed, but will almost always include policy menus, time series and trend forecasts as close to real-time as possible to ensure adjustment of each strategy. Some documents are hosted on specialized software that allows users to review plans in "breakout rooms", as in the most comprehensive version of WorldGame 2.0.

In the o.s. Earth version, the teams were first given multimedia content including PowerPoint presentations. Then they were given cards that depicted solutions signifying advancements in health, education, technology, environment, or human rights. They were obliged to negotiate with mega-corporation and UN analogues for these cards, which could be purchased with oversized poker chips representing large amounts of money; these were fitted into plastic trays. Lastly, they could stick the cards into folders representing development levels. Earlier sessions saw players select a team out of the 20 total by taking a badge and labeled hat, while in later sessions the players were randomly assigned.

== Reception ==
In 1995, Los Angeles Times reporter Tony Perry covered the UCSD session, and lightheartedly compared it to the board game Monopoly. He also noted Gabel's role in expanding the World Game into the area of briefing corporate clients.

In 2021, arts professor Timothy Stott published a book titled Buckminster Fuller's World Game and its Legacy, which analyzed the World Game and its history. He found that there were extensive contrasts between its purported stateless, cosmopolitan approach to world problems and its conception during the height of 1960s U.S. technological and cultural hegemony, as well as tensions between its apolitical, anarchic aspirations and technocratic character. He also found that participants often failed to grasp and manipulate the complex systems of the game.

== See also ==
- Megagame
- Model United Nations
- Peace war game
