= Megagame =

Large-scale tabletop simulation game

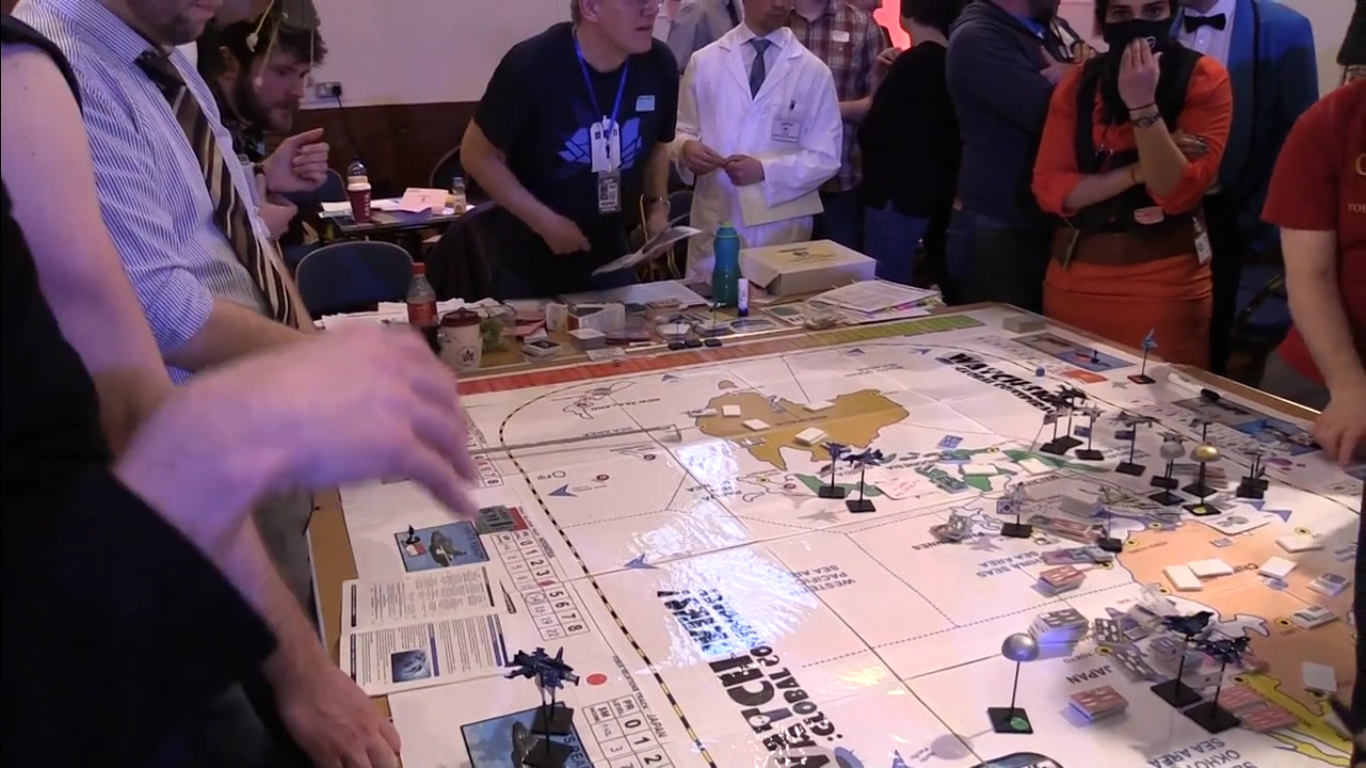
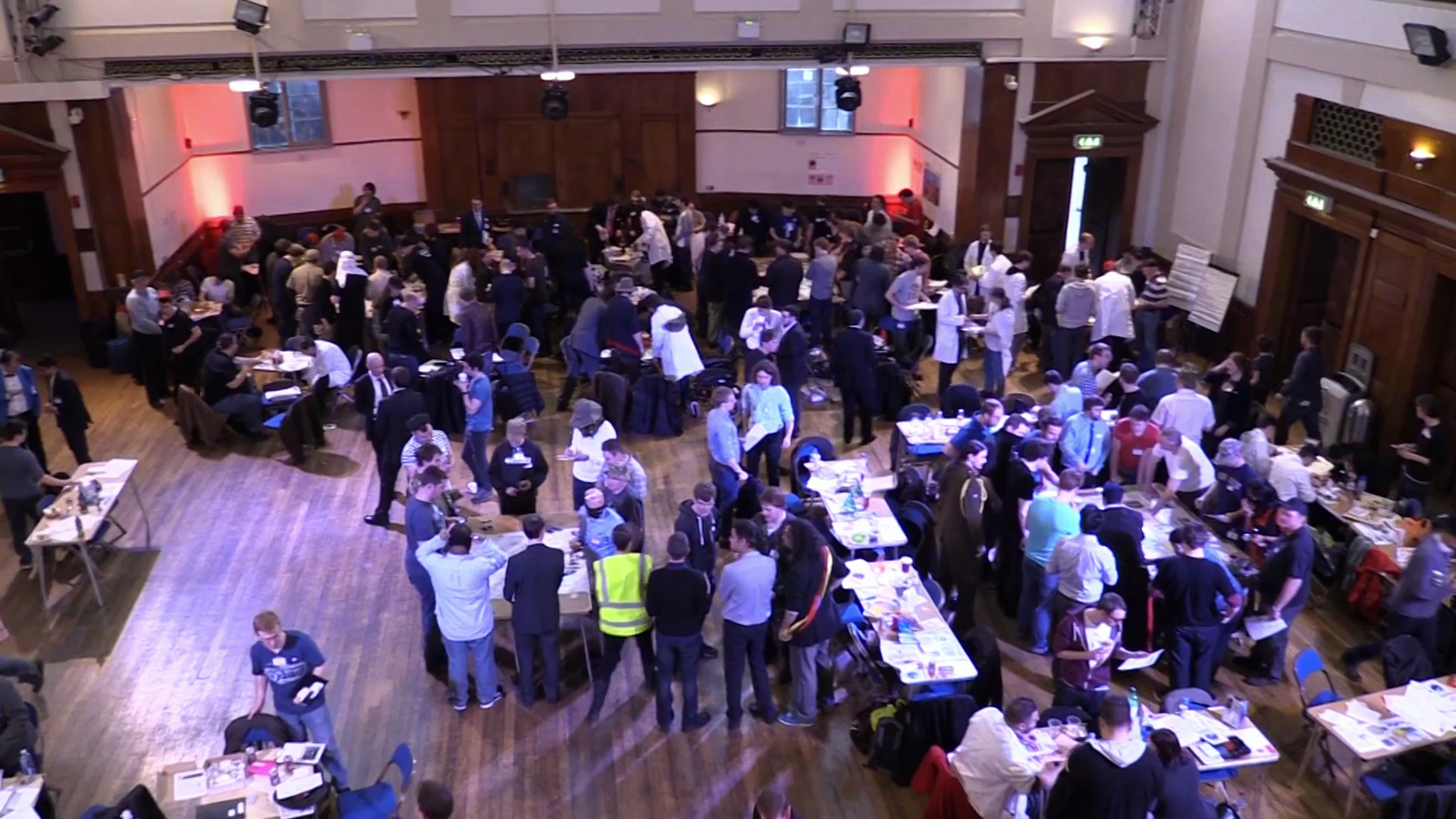
An area board and overhead view from the megagame Watch the Skies

A megagame (sometimes capitalised as Megagame or MegaGame) is a type of large-scale simulation which can contain elements of role-playing games, tabletop games, LARPs and wargames. Megagames are typically played by 30-100 players over the course of a full day. Participants are often arranged into hierarchies of teams cooperating or competing towards various objectives.

== History ==
Megagames have their roots in war games and have been played since the 1970s, primarily in the United Kingdom. The megagame format originated with wargame designers Paddy Griffith and Jim Wallman, who designed wargames which involved small teams with unique objectives. Wallman has since designed more than 80 megagames.

In 2014, board game website Shut Up & Sit Down published a video documenting their experiences of playing a megagame, which has been credited for prompting renewed interest in designing and playing megagames. After the video went viral, Wallman says his group of regular players grew from hundreds to thousands of people. The first group outside the UK to run a Megagame after the video were the New York MegaGame Society.

== Gameplay ==
The typical gameplay structure of a megagame is one in which dozens of players compete or cooperate within a set of tabletop and role-playing games. Individual players are typically members of small teams, and must interact with both the game's systems as well as other participating players. Because of the large scale involved, individual players never have all the information about the state of the game, often relying instead on hierarchies and reports to understand the larger context of the game or what other teams have been doing. Megagames typically involve 30-100 players, though some have been played with hundreds of people, and often last a full day.

Megagames can encompass a wide range of different settings, scenarios, and rules, including military, historical intrigue, and alien invasions. Jim Wallman, designer of Watch the Skies, describes the rules of megagames as a "framework", from which the game's designers and referees (known as "control members") can make rulings on the fly, like a Dungeon Master. During the course of the game, referees might announce rule clarifications or new events, and often have to create new rules to respond to player desires. Other megagames have a greater focus on specific rules, with less need for adjudications by control members.

While most megagames are played at a single venue, some, such as the 2017 Urban Nightmare: State of Chaos megagame have been played across multiple locations.

=== Watch the Skies ===
Watch the Skies has been credited as the most popular megagame, having been played around the world. In Watch the Skies, players are split into small teams representing world countries responding to an alien invasion, with each player having an individual role within their team, such as head of state or UN ambassador. In addition to playing in their own teams, players also join committees and engage with members of other countries, while playing mini-games to determine the outcome for their country. Watch the Skies includes a group of players in press organisations who share news stories about what teams have been doing.

== See also ==
- Monster game
- Model United Nations
- World Game
