= Adams hemisphere-in-a-square projection =

Conformal map projection

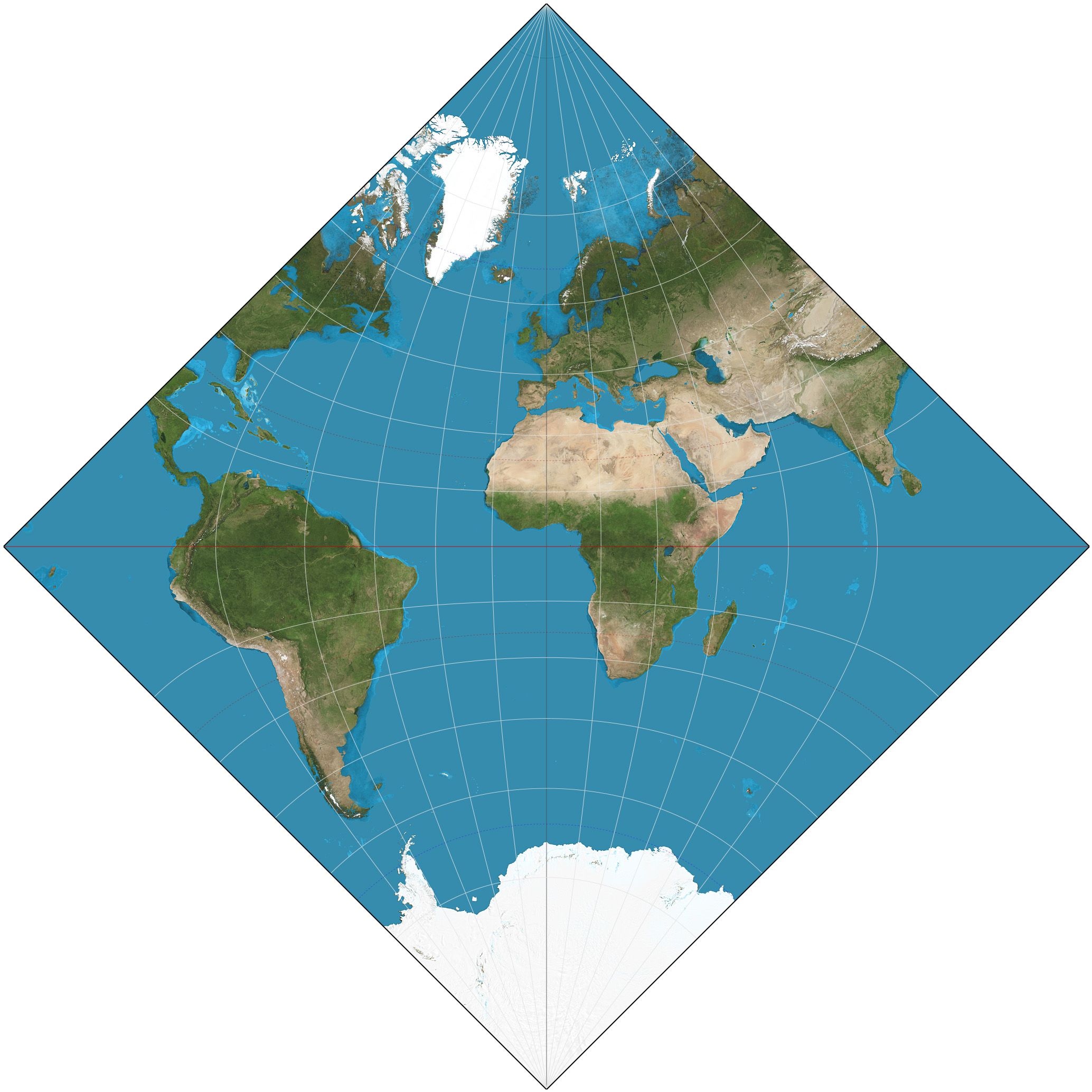
Adams hemisphere-in-a-square projection. 15° graticule.

The Adams doubly periodic projection with Tissot's indicatrix of deformation.

The Adams hemisphere-in-a-square is a conformal map projection for a hemisphere. It is a transverse version of the Peirce quincuncial projection, and is named after American cartographer Oscar S. Adams, who published it in 1925. When it is used to represent the entire sphere it is known as the Adams doubly periodic projection. Like many conformal projections, conformality fails at certain points, in this case at the four corners.

== See also ==
- List of map projections
- Guyou hemisphere-in-a-square projection
- Doubly periodic function
