= Shut Up & Sit Down =

Board game review website and YouTube channel

- The logo for the SUSD website

YouTube information
- Channel: Shut Up & Sit Down
- Years active: 2011-present
- Subscribers: 455 thousand
- Views: 109 million
- Last updated: 19 December 2025
- Website: www.shutupandsitdown.com

Shut Up & Sit Down (often abbreviated to SUSD) is a board game review website and YouTube channel headed by Tom Brewster and Matt Lees. The channel formerly had Quintin Smith and Paul Dean as members, and has featured Ava Foxfort, Philippa Warr of Rock Paper Shotgun and PC Gamer, Emily from Emily and Things, and Brendan Caldwell of Rock Paper Shotgun.

== Content ==
The Shut Up & Sit Down YouTube channel mostly features reviews of board games with dry and surreal sketch comedy. The website features blog-style reviews, and has a podcast, Shut Up & Sit Down: The Podcast!

A guiding principle in the critics' work is "social togetherness" and bringing people together through board games. A frequent criticism from SUSD concerns the prevalence of large plastic miniatures in some board games, which they find fault with due to their high cost. Some reviews discuss the intersections of board games with histories of colonialism and slavery.

The channel has featured playthroughs of megagames, the first of which prompted renewed interest in designing and playing megagames, particularly in exporting the hobby from the United Kingdom to the United States. Noam Strassfeld and Shyamal Ruparel of the New York MegaGame Society, who organized the first American megagame, were first made aware of megagames through Shut Up & Sit Down.

== Reception ==
The Guardian credited Shut Up & Sit Down (alongside the website BoardGameGeek and Wil Wheaton's YouTube show TableTop) with opening "a window of interest" on the internet for tabletop gaming. Polygon deemed Shut Up & Sit Down: The Podcast! the best board game podcast of 2016. In 2018, IGN recommended the SUSD YouTube channel as "a great way to explore a hobby that is growing fast". Gordon Calleja praised SUSD for accelerating the "belated process" of "sensitivity to inclusiveness with regard to ethnicity" in board games. Calleja also highlights Shut Up and Sit Down's emphasis on the relationship between play, sociality and happiness in the context of playing board games.

The channel's popularity is seen as very influential in the wider tabletop game industry. In 2021, board game company Z-Man Games sunsetted its production of a line of "classic" euro board games, implying in a blog post by its studio head, Steve Kimball, that Shut Up & Sit Down and other UK board game reviewers "hold massive sway over the current industry’s focus". The post also stated that "if you do attempt to re-release a game via traditional distribution channels, then you need to pray that any number of witty UK board game influencers take notice and give you coverage."

== SHUX conventions ==
In 2017, Shut Up & Sit Down debuted SHUX, a yearly board gaming convention at Vancouver Convention Centre centered around the website. In 2020, due to the COVID-19 pandemic, the team behind the convention instead created AwSHUX which was an online and free version of the convention. SHUX has had four in-person conventions in Vancouver (2017, 2018, 2019, 2022) and three digital (2020 and twice in 2021).
