= Walter Davis Lambert =

American geodesist (1879–1968)

Walter Davis Lambert (January 12, 1879 – October 27, 1968) was an American geodesist. Known for his mathematics work with the U.S. Coast and Geodetic Survey and in higher education, in 1949 he was elected to the National Academy of Sciences, won the William Bowie Medal, and was awarded the Department of Commerce Gold Medal.

== Biography ==
Lambert was born in West New Brighton, New York on January 12, 1879, (Note: Some sources state his place of birth was the adjacent neighborhood of New Brighton.) with English ancestry. He attended public school as well as the Friends Seminary, and later matriculated at Harvard University. In 1900, he graduated with a Bachelor of Arts degree; in 1901 he received a Master of Arts degree from Harvard. From 1901 to 1902, he was an instructor in mathematics at Purdue University. For the following two years, he taught math and astronomy at the University of Maine. In 1904, he accepted an offer to work for the U.S. Coast and Geodetic Survey as a mathematician. He worked on a part-time basis for some time while instructing math and pursuing postgraduate studies at the University of Pennsylvania. After becoming full-time again in 1911, he travelled to Washington, D.C., to work for the survey.

He served in World War I. In 1917, he was commissioned as a first lieutenant in the U.S. Army, serving in France with the 101st Engineering Regiment; he returned to the Coast and Geodetic Survey in 1919, after the war. During this time he became more involved in the International Association of Geodesy. In 1929, Lambert wrote back and forth with Beno Gutenberg about the international participation of the Deutsche Geophysikalische Gesellschaft. Later, Lambert served as president of the association from 1946 to 1951. To honor him, he was made honorary president for the rest of his life. He had retired from the survey in 1949.

Post-retirement, he was involved in geodesy at Ohio State University; for his contributions, the university awarded him an honorary Doctor of Science degree in 1957. He died on October 27, 1968, in Washington, D.C.
