= Guyou hemisphere-in-a-square projection =

Map projection

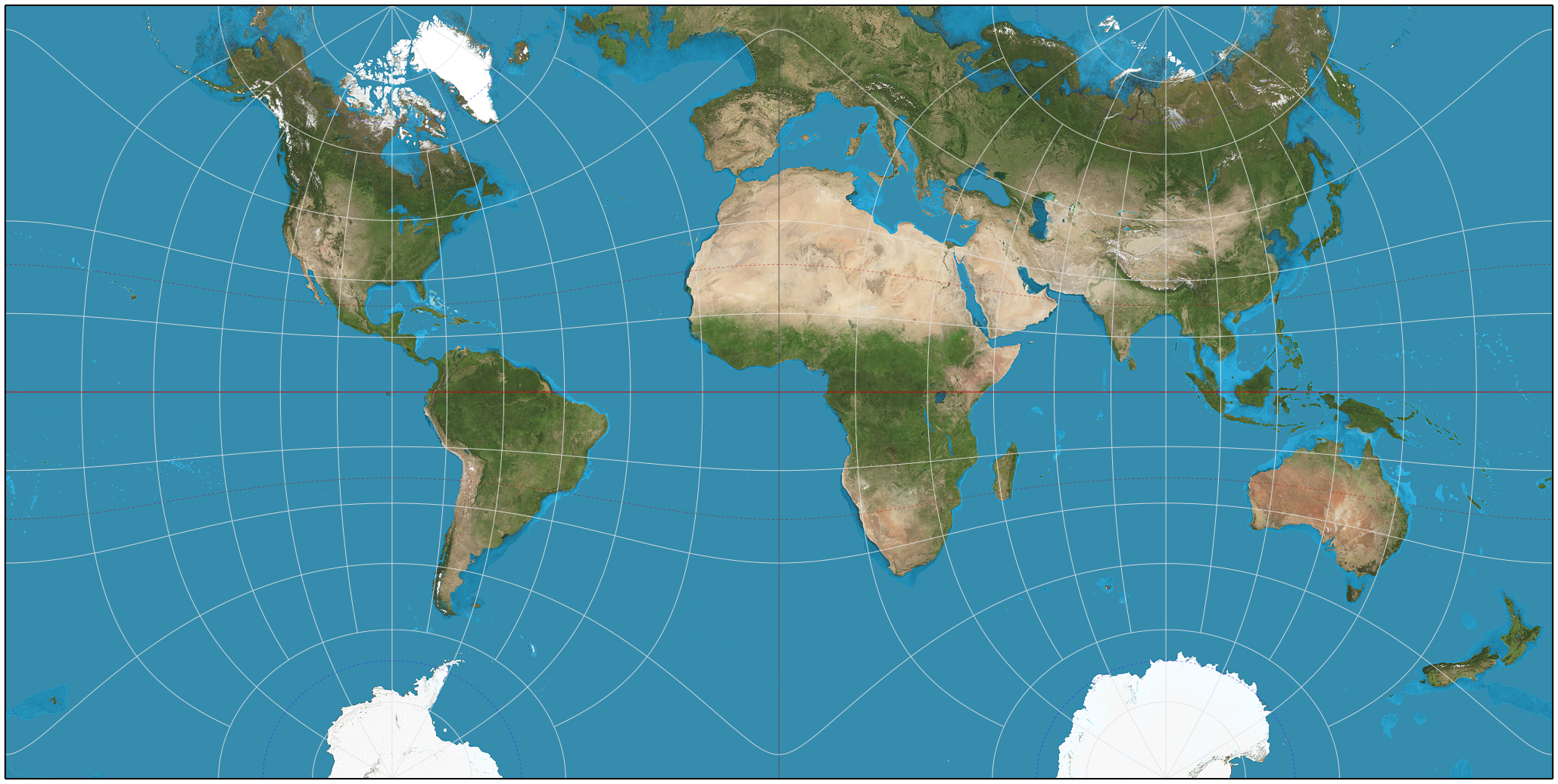
Guyou doubly periodic projection of the world

The Guyou hemisphere-in-a-square projection with Tissot's indicatrix of deformation. The indicatrix is omitted at the singular points. At those points the deformation is infinite; the indicatrix would be infinite in size.

The Guyou hemisphere-in-a-square projection is a conformal map projection for the hemisphere. It is an oblique aspect of the Peirce quincuncial projection.

== History ==
The projection was developed by Émile Guyou of France in 1887.

== Formal description ==
The projection can be computed as an oblique aspect of the Peirce quincuncial projection by rotating the axis 45 degrees. It can also be computed by rotating the coordinates −45 degrees before computing the stereographic projection; this projection is then remapped into a square whose coordinates are then rotated 45 degrees.

The projection is conformal except for the four corners of each hemisphere's square. Like other conformal polygonal projections, the Guyou is a Schwarz–Christoffel mapping.

== Properties ==
Its properties are very similar to those of the Peirce quincuncial projection:

- Each hemisphere is represented as a square, the sphere as a rectangle of aspect ratio 2:1.
- The part where the exaggeration of scale amounts to double that at the centre of each square is only 9% of the area of the sphere, against 13% for the Mercator and 50% for the stereographic.
- The curvature of lines representing great circles is, in every case, very slight, over the greater part of their length.
- It is conformal everywhere except at the corners of the square that corresponds to each hemisphere, where two meridians change direction abruptly twice each; the Equator is represented by a horizontal line.
- It can be tessellated in all directions.

== Related projections ==
- The Adams hemisphere-in-a-square projection and the Peirce quincuncial projection are different aspects of the same underlying Schwarz–Christoffel mapping. Such mappings are transformations of half a stereographic projection.

== See also ==
- List of map projections
