= Geocell (cartography) =

In geographic information systems, a geocell (or geo-cell) is a patch on the surface of the Earth that is 1 degree of latitude by 1 degree of longitude in extent.

At the equator, a geocell is approximately a 111x111 kilometres (69 mi) square - but the east-west dimension of geocells gradually decreases and the shape of the geocell becomes increasingly trapezoidal towards the poles. At the North and South poles, geocells are distorted into long, thin triangles which are still approximately 111 kilometres (69 mi) in the north/south direction but with a base of just 969 metres (3,179 ft).
