= Peirce quincuncial projection =

Conformal map projection

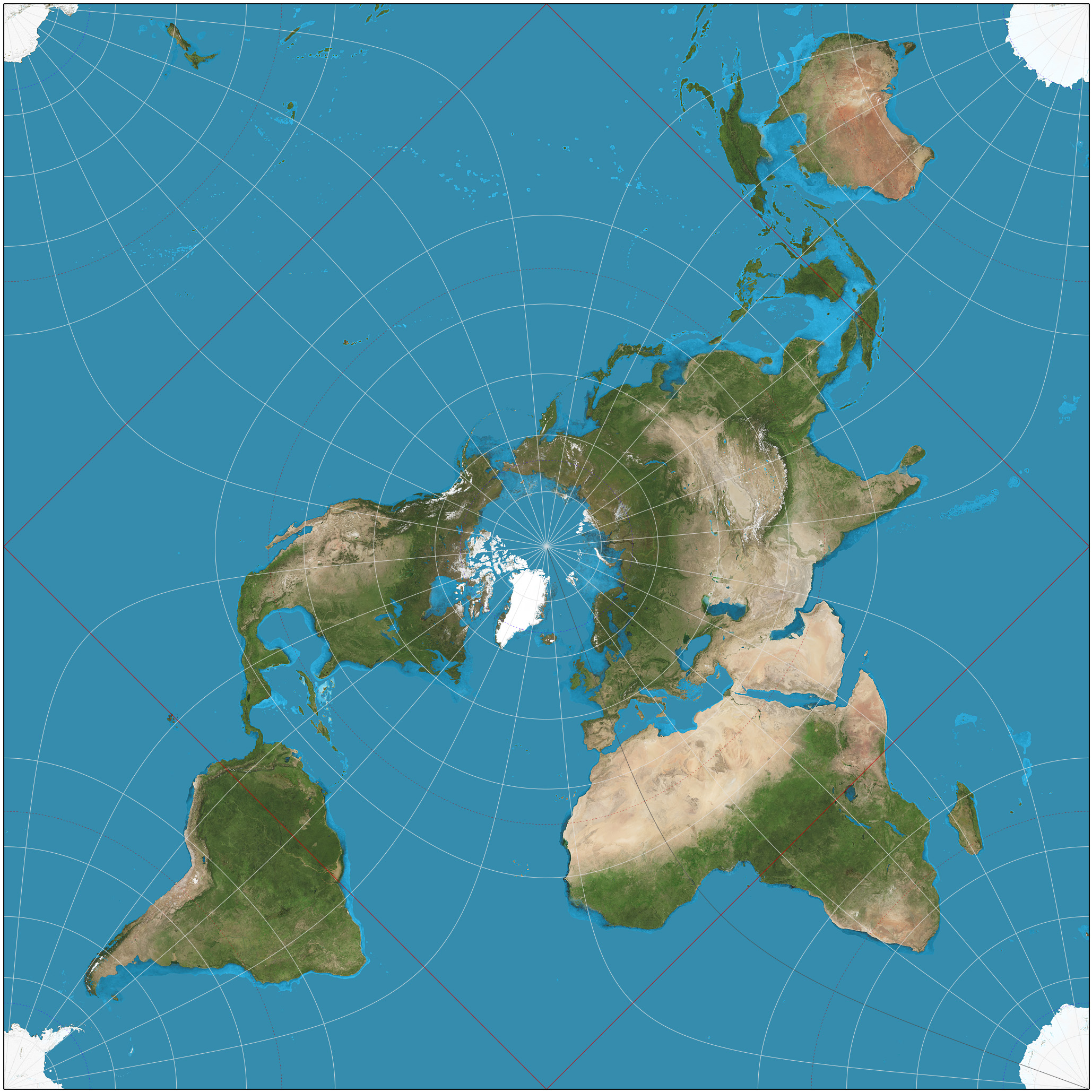
Peirce quincuncial projection of the world. The red equator is a square whose corners are the only four points on the map at which the projection fails to be conformal.

The Peirce quincuncial projection with Tissot's indicatrix of deformation.

The Peirce quincuncial projection is the conformal map projection from the sphere to an unfolded square dihedron, developed by Charles Sanders Peirce in 1877. Each octant projects onto an isosceles right triangle, with eight such triangles arranged into a square. The name quincuncial refers to this arrangement: the north pole at the center and quarters of the south pole in the corners form a quincunx pattern like the pips on the five face of a traditional die. The projection has the distinctive property that it forms a seamless square tiling of the plane, conformal except at four singular points along the equator.

Typically the projection is square and oriented such that the north pole lies at the center, but an oblique aspect in a rectangle was proposed by Émile Guyou in 1887, and a transverse aspect was proposed by Oscar S. Adams in 1925.

The projection has seen use in digital photography for portraying spherical panoramas.

== History ==
The maturation of complex analysis in the 19th century led to general techniques for conformal mapping, where angle-preserving maps between points in the Euclidean plane are represented by analytic functions of numbers in the complex plane. In 1851 Bernhard Riemann stated the Riemann mapping theorem, that the interior of any planar shape without holes could be conformally mapped to the interior of a disk, but did not explicitly construct such maps. In 1867 and 1869, respectively, Elwin Christoffel and Hermann Schwarz each independently developed a formula for mapping between a disk and an arbitrary simple polygon, now known as Schwarz–Christoffel mapping. Schwarz had explicitly described the conformal mapping of a disk onto a square.

Inspired by Schwarz, in 1877, the mathematician and philosopher Charles Sanders Peirce, then working at the United States Coast and Geodetic Survey, combined the stereographic projection from hemisphere to disk with Schwarz's disk-to-square projection, to develop his "quincuncial projection". In the normal aspect, Peirce's projection presents the northern hemisphere in a square; the southern hemisphere is split into four isosceles triangles symmetrically surrounding the first one, akin to star-like projections. In effect, the whole map is a square, inspiring Peirce to call his projection quincuncial, after the arrangement of five items in a quincunx.

After Peirce presented his projection, two other cartographers developed similar projections of the hemisphere (or the whole sphere, after a suitable rearrangement) on a square: Guyou in 1887 and Adams in 1925. The three projections are transversal versions of each other (see related projections below).

== Formal description ==
The Peirce quincuncial projection is "formed by transforming the stereographic projection with a pole at infinity, by means of an elliptic function". The Peirce quincuncial is really a projection of the hemisphere, but its tessellation properties (see below) permit its use for the entire sphere. The projection maps the interior of a circle onto the interior of a square by means of the Schwarz–Christoffel mapping, as follows:

$$\operatorname{sd} \left(\sqrt 2 w , \frac{1}{\sqrt 2}\right) = \sqrt 2 \, r$$

where

- sd is the ratio of two Jacobi elliptic functions: $\tfrac{\rm sn}{\rm dn};$
- w is the mapped point on the plane as a complex number (w = x + iy);
- r is the stereographic projection with a scale of 1/2 at the center.

An elliptic integral of the first kind can be used to solve for w. The comma notation used for sd(u, k) means that $\tfrac 1 \sqrt{2}$ is the modulus for the elliptic function ratio, as opposed to the parameter [which would be written sd(u|m)] or the amplitude [which would be written sd(u\α)]. The mapping has a scale factor of 1/2 at the center, like the generating stereographic projection.

Note that:
$$\operatorname{sd} \left(\sqrt 2 w , \frac{1}{\sqrt 2}\right) = \sqrt 2 \operatorname{sl}\left(w\right)$$
is the lemniscatic sine function (see Lemniscate elliptic functions).

== Properties ==
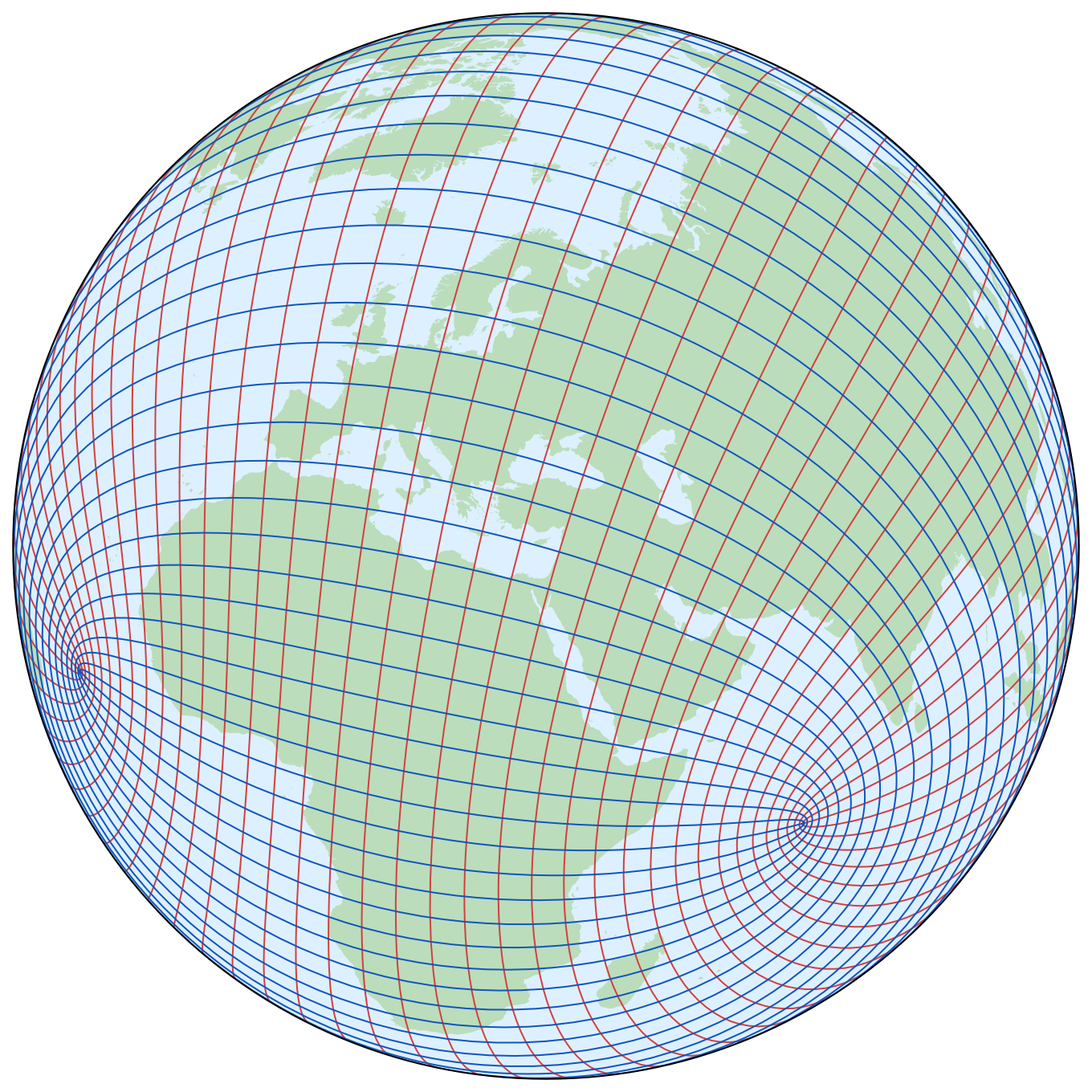
A grid on the square dihedron under inverse Peirce quincuncial projection is conformal except at four singularities around the equator. Each grid line is a spherical conic.

According to Peirce, his projection has the following properties (Peirce, 1879):

- The sphere is presented in a square.
- The part where the exaggeration of scale amounts to double that at the centre is only 9% of the area of the sphere, against 13% for the Mercator projection and 50% for the stereographic projection.
- The curvature of lines representing great circles is, in every case, very slight, over the greater part of their length.
- It is conformal everywhere except at the four corners of the inner hemisphere (thus the midpoints of edges of the projection), where the equator and four meridians change direction abruptly (the equator is represented by a square). These are singularities where differentiability fails.
- It can be tessellated in all directions.

== Tiled Peirce quincuncial maps ==
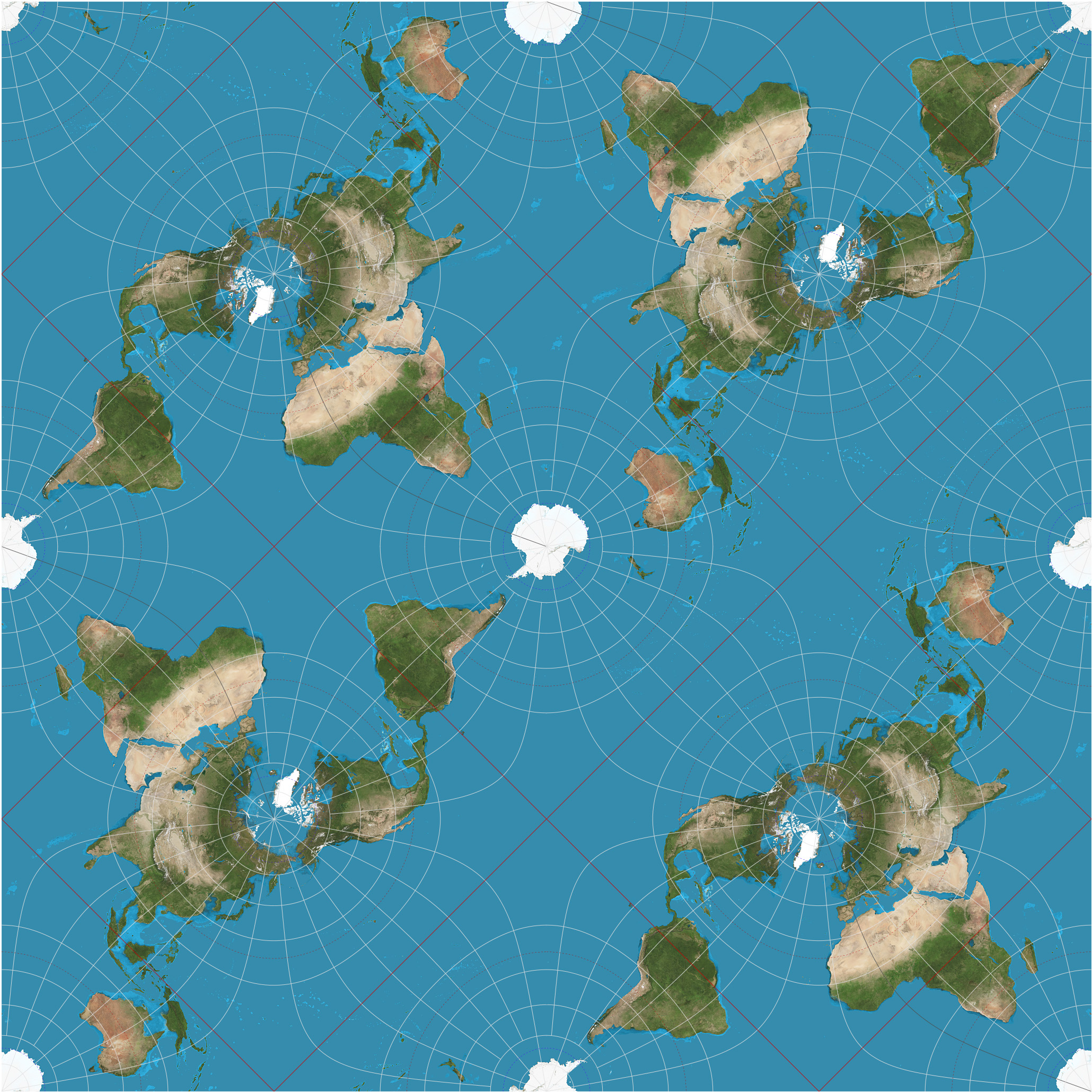
Tessellated version of the Peirce quincuncial map

The projection tessellates the plane; i.e., repeated copies can completely cover (tile) an arbitrary area, each copy's features exactly matching those of its neighbors. (See the example to the right). Furthermore, the four triangles of the second hemisphere of Peirce quincuncial projection can be rearranged as another square that is placed next to the square that corresponds to the first hemisphere, resulting in a rectangle with aspect ratio of 2:1; this arrangement is equivalent to the transverse aspect of the Guyou hemisphere-in-a-square projection.

== Known uses ==
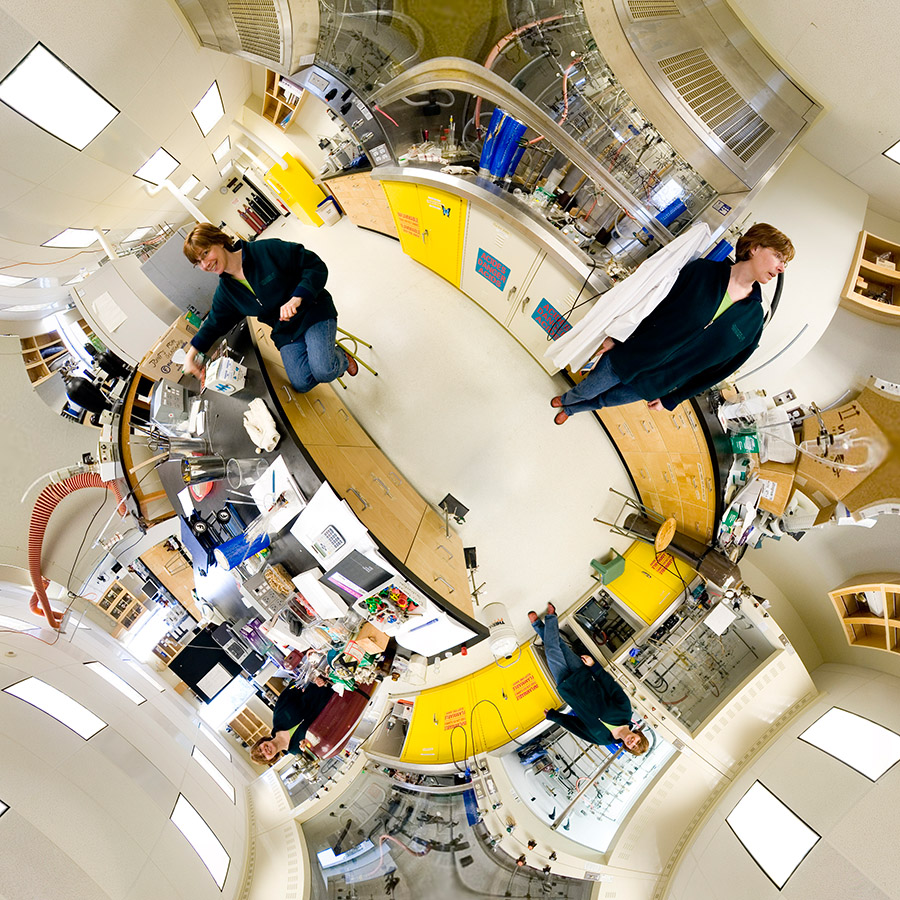
Using the Peirce quincuncial projection to present a spherical panorama.

Like many other projections based upon complex numbers, the Peirce quincuncial has been rarely used for geographic purposes. One of the few recorded cases is in 1946, when it was used by the U.S. Coast and Geodetic Survey world map of air routes. It has been used recently to present spherical panoramas for practical as well as aesthetic purposes, where it can present the entire sphere with most areas being recognizable.

== Related projections ==
In transverse aspect, one hemisphere becomes the Adams hemisphere-in-a-square projection (the pole is placed at the corner of the square). Its four singularities are at the North Pole, the South Pole, on the equator at 25°W, and on the equator at 155°E, in the Arctic, Atlantic, and Pacific oceans, and in Antarctica. That great circle divides the traditional Western and Eastern hemispheres.

In oblique aspect (45 degrees) of one hemisphere becomes the Guyou hemisphere-in-a-square projection (the pole is placed in the middle of the edge of the square). Its four singularities are at 45 degrees north and south latitude on the great circle composed of the 20°W meridian and the 160°E meridians, in the Atlantic and Pacific oceans. That great circle divides the traditional western and eastern hemispheres.

== See also ==
- List of map projections
- Lee conformal world in a tetrahedron
