= Oscar S. Adams =

American mathematician and geodesist (1874–1962)

Oscar Sherman Adams
- Adams in 1933
- Born: January 9, 1874; Mount Vernon, Ohio, U.S.
- Died: March 5, 1962 (aged 88); Mount Vernon, Ohio, U.S.
- Education: Kenyon College
- Spouses: M. Edna Fuller (m. 1900–1935) ; Pauline G. Pealer (m. 1937)
- Scientific career
- Fields: Geodesy; cartography
- Workplaces: U.S. Coast and Geodetic Survey, Washington, D.C.

Oscar Sherman Adams (January 9, 1874 – March 5, 1962) was an American mathematician, geodesist, and cartographer who worked for the United States Coast and Geodetic Survey from 1910 to 1944. He was one of the foremost experts on map projections, and was instrumental in the foundation of the North American Datum of 1927 and the State Plane Coordinate System.

== Life and career ==
=== Early life, military service, and school administration ===
Adams was born on January 9, 1874, on a farm near Mount Vernon, Ohio, the youngest child of David Washington Adams and Louisa A. Adams (née McElroy). He attended local public schools in Gambier, and was an undergraduate student at Kenyon College, where he earned a Bachelor of Science degree as valedictorian of the class of 1896.

Both of Adams's parents died in 1893, when he was 19 years old.

In April 1898 the Spanish–American War began. Adams joined Company L of the Fourth Regiment Ohio Volunteers Infantry and was sent as a corporal to fight in the Puerto Rico campaign. The 4th Ohio arrived in Puerto Rico on August 3, captured the town of Guayama, and were set to make another attack when an armistice was signed and hostilities abruptly ended on August 12. By early November the regiment was back home, and in January was disbanded.

After the war, Adams returned to Ohio to teach mathematics, and became the superintendent of schools in Centerburg 1899–1903, Dover 1903–1905, and Rock Creek 1905–1906; he was high school principal in North Madison 1906–1910.

=== Coast and Geodetic Survey ===
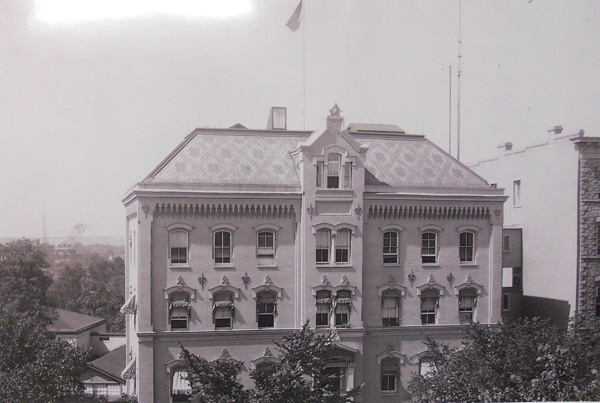
The Richards Building, Washington, D.C. headquarters of the C&GS until 1929

In 1910, Adams took a job as a geodetic computer with the Coast and Geodetic Survey (C&GS) in Manila, the Philippines, at that time an unincorporated U.S. territory conquered in the Spanish–American War. In 1913, he was assigned to the Washington, D.C. headquarters of the C&GS, where he remained until his retirement.

In 1915, Adams published a technical manual (about adjusting triangulation networks) for the C&GS, the first of many, for which he earned a Master of Arts degree from Kenyon; in 1922 Kenyon awarded him an honorary Doctor of Science degree.

In September 1917, with the entry of the United States into World War I, Adams and many other C&GS employees were transferred to the military, Adams as a first lieutenant in the Corps of Engineers. While many of the newly minted C&GS Corps officers were sent on field missions overseas, for instance as marine navigators or artillery orienteering officers, Adams stayed in Washington, D.C. and in less than two months was discharged back to the C&GS.

Adams rose through the geodesy ranks at the C&GS, from geodetic computer to mathematician, senior mathematician, and finally principal mathematician, one of the top technical positions. During the 1920s–1940s he was one of the top theoretical experts on geodesy and map projections within the U.S. federal government, personally making many decisions about the projections used for maps of the United States and various states, and overseeing their computations.

=== Personal life, retirement and death ===
On June 20, 1900, Adams, then superintendent of Centerburg, Ohio, married Mary Edna Fuller. The couple had three children together, Catherine, Jane Elizabeth, and George David.

In November 1935, Adams's wife Edna died. Two years later, in 1937, Adams married the widow Pauline Gleason Pealer; they had one daughter, Carola Ann.

In July 1944, Adams retired from the C&GS and moved back to Ohio with his wife, to a farm they bought near Mount Vernon. About 18 years later, on March 5, 1962, he died of viral pneumonia, age 88; he was buried in Arlington National Cemetery.

== Other professional activities ==
In the late 1910s, Adams was a regular contributor of problems and solutions to the American Mathematical Monthly.

== Bibliography ==
=== Books and technical reports ===
- Adams, Oscar S. (1915), Application of the Theory of Least Squares to the Adjustment of Triangulation, Department of Commerce, U.S. Coast and Geodetic Survey, Washington: Government Printing Office, Special Publication No. 28
- —— (1918), Lambert Projection Tables for the United States, U.S. Coast and Geodetic Survey, Special Pub. No. 52
- —— (1918), General Theory of the Lambert Conformal Conic Projection (PDF), U.S. Coast and Geodetic Survey, Special Pub. No. 53
- —— (1919), General Theory of Polyconic Projections, U.S. Coast and Geodetic Survey, Special Pub. No. 57
- —— & William Bowie (1919), Grid System for Progressive Maps in the United States (PDF), U.S. Coast and Geodetic Survey, Special Pub. No. 59
- —— (1919), A Study of Map Projections in General, U.S. Coast and Geodetic Survey, Special Pub. No. 60
- —— (1921), Latitude Developments Connected with Geodesy and Cartography (PDF), U.S. Coast and Geodetic Survey, Special Pub. No. 67
- —— & Charles H. Deetz (1921), Elements of Map Projection with Applications to Map and Chart Construction, U.S. Coast and Geodetic Survey, Special Pub. No. 68; revised ed. 1928, 3rd ed. 1931, 4th ed. 1935, 5th ed. 1945
- —— (1921), Radio-Compass Bearings, U.S. Coast and Geodetic Survey, Special Pub. No. 75
- —— (1924), Some Elementary Examples of Least Squares (PDF), U.S. Coast and Geodetic Survey, Serial No. 250
- —— (1925), Elliptic Functions Applied to Conformal World Maps (PDF), U.S. Coast and Geodetic Survey, Special Pub. No. 112
- —— (1926), Report on the Readjustment of the First-Order Triangulation Net of the Western Part of the United States (PDF), U.S. Coast and Geodetic Survey, Serial No. 350
- —— (1927), Tables for Albers Projection (PDF), U.S. Coast and Geodetic Survey, Special Pub. No. 130
- —— (1929), Conformal Projection of the Sphere within a Square (PDF), U.S. Coast and Geodetic Survey, hdl:2027/osu.32435001559756, Special Pub. No. 153
- —— (1930), The Bowie Method of Triangulation Adjustment (PDF), U.S. Coast and Geodetic Survey, Special Pub. No. 159
- —— (1930), Triangulation on Colorado [1927 Datum] (PDF), U.S. Coast and Geodetic Survey, Special Pub. No. 160
- —— (1933), Plane Coordinate Systems, U.S. Coast and Geodetic Survey, Serial No. 562; revised eds. 1936, 1948
- —— (1935), First and Second Order Triangulation and Traverse in North Carolina (1927 Datum) (PDF), U.S. Coast and Geodetic Survey, Special Pub. No. 192; Volume 2, No. 218, 1940
- —— & Charles N. Claire (1935), Manual of Plane-Coordinate Computation (PDF), U.S. Coast and Geodetic Survey, Special Pub. No. 193; reprinted 1948
- —— & Charles N. Claire (1935), Manual of Traverse Computation on the Lambert Grid (PDF), U.S. Coast and Geodetic Survey, Special Pub. No. 194
- —— & Charles N. Claire (1935), Manual of Traverse Computation on the Transverse Mercator Grid (PDF), U.S. Coast and Geodetic Survey, Special Pub. No. 195
- —— (1936), Azimuths from Plane Coordinates (PDF), U.S. Coast and Geodetic Survey, Serial No. 584
- —— & L. G. Simmons (1944), Geographic Positions by Machine Computation (PDF), Coast and Geodetic Survey
- —— (1945), General Theory of Equivalent Projections (PDF), U.S. Coast and Geodetic Survey, Special Pub. No. 236

=== Papers ===
- Adams, Oscar S. & Walter D. Lambert (1921), "Mathematical Problems in the Work of the United States Coast and Geodetic Survey", The American Mathematical Monthly, 28 (10): 363–368, doi:10.1080/00029890.1921.11986065, JSTOR 2972157
- Adams, Oscar S. (1923), "The Results of the Triangulation Done in California in 1922 to Test the Stability of the Earth's Surface", Transactions, American Geophysical Union, 4: 90–91, doi:10.1029/tr004i001p00090
- —— (1924), "Projections as Framework for Maps", The Military Engineer, 16 (88): 320–322, JSTOR 44693676
- —— (1925), "Projections for Maps: New Conformal World Maps Derived from Elliptic Functions", Transactions, American Geophysical Union, 6: 45–46, doi:10.1029/TR006i001p00045
- —— (1925), "The Rhombic Conformal Projection", Bulletin Géodésique, 5: 1–26, doi:10.1007/BF03400532
- —— (1926), "The Readjustment of the First-Order Triangulation in the Western Half of the United States", Transactions, American Geophysical Union, 7: 51–53, doi:10.1029/tr007i001p00051
- —— (1927), "Loop-Closures Resulting from the Readjustment of the First-Order Triangulation in the Western Part of the United States", Transactions, American Geophysical Union, 8: 62–65, doi:10.1029/TR008i001p00062
- —— (1927), "Circuit Closures In Triangulation", The Military Engineer, 19 (104): 153, JSTOR 44572751
- —— (1928), "Readjustment of the Triangulation in the Western Part of the United States", Transactions, American Geophysical Union, 9: 44, doi:10.1029/TR009i001p00044
- —— (1928), アダムス氏蝶々地圖 [Mathematical Theory of the Conformal Butterfly Map], Journal of the Meteorological Society of Japan, ser. 2 (in Japanese), 6 (12): 456–458, doi:10.2151/jmsj1923.6.12_456
- —— & Walter D. Lambert (1929), "A Form for the Computation of Geodetic Positions", Bulletin Géodésique, 22: 55–63, doi:10.1007/BF03031137
- —— (1929), "Review: The Chequered Career of Ferdinand Rudolph Hassler, First Superintendent of the United States Coast Survey, by Florian Cajori", The American Mathematical Monthly, 36 (5): 283–285, doi:10.1080/00029890.1929.11986955, JSTOR 2298514
- —— (1931), "Parabolic Equal-Area Projection World Map", The Military Engineer, 23 (129): 264–265, JSTOR 44688069
- —— (1932), "Geographical centers", The Military Engineer, 24 (138): 586–587, JSTOR 44566445
- —— (1934), "Plane Coordinate-Systems for Individual States", Transactions, American Geophysical Union, 15 (1): 36–38, doi:10.1029/TR015i001p00036
- —— (1934), "Flatland: Not a romance but a necessary expedient", Journal of the Washington Academy of Sciences, 24 (5): 201–216, JSTOR 24522293
- —— (1936), "Conformal Map of the World in a Square, Poles in the Middle of Opposite Sides", Bulletin Géodésique, 52: 461–473, doi:10.1007/BF03031271
- —— (1937), "Plane Coördinate Systems in Regional Surveys", The Military Engineer, 29 (163): 10–12, JSTOR 44555332
- —— (1936), "Computation of a Plane-Coordinate Table for a Zone on the Lambert Grid" (PDF), Geodetic Letter, 3 (3): 13–15
- —— (1936), "Computation of a Plane-Coordinate Table for a Zone on the Transverse Mercator Grid" (PDF), Geodetic Letter, 3 (3): 15–17
- —— (1937), "State-wide Systems of Plane Coordinates" (PDF), Geodetic Letter, 4 (1): 10–16
- —— (1939), "Discussion of Paper No. 2038: R. R. Rowe, 'The Three-Point Problem in a Co-ordinated Field'", Transactions of the American Society of Civil Engineers, 104: 1325–1326, doi:10.1061/TACEAT.0005033
- —— (1944), "Notes on the Geometry of the Triangle", The American Mathematical Monthly, 51 (2): 85–87, doi:10.1080/00029890.1944.11991480, JSTOR 2304084

== See also ==
- Laurence Patrick Lee
- William Bowie
