= Borwein =

Borwein is a surname. Notable people with the surname include:

- David Borwein (1924–2021), Lithuania-born Canadian mathematician
- Jonathan Borwein (1951–2016), Scotland-born Canadian mathematician and a professor
- Peter Borwein (1953–2020), Scotland-born Canadian mathematician and a professor

== See also ==
- Borwein's algorithm, algorithm devised by Jonathan and Peter Borwein to calculate the value of 1/π.
- Borwein integral
- Bailey–Borwein–Plouffe formula, a spigot algorithm for computing the nth binary digit of pi (symbol: π) using base 16 math
- Erdős–Borwein constant, the sum of the reciprocals of the Mersenne numbers. It is named after Paul Erdős and Peter Borwein.
