= Experimental mathematics =

Approach to mathematics using computation

Experimental mathematics is an approach to mathematics in which computation is used to investigate mathematical objects and identify properties and patterns. It has been defined as "that branch of mathematics that concerns itself ultimately with the codification and transmission of insights within the mathematical community through the use of experimental (in either the Galilean, Baconian, Aristotelian or Kantian sense) exploration of conjectures and more informal beliefs and a careful analysis of the data acquired in this pursuit."

As expressed by Paul Halmos: "Mathematics is not a deductive science—that's a cliché. When you try to prove a theorem, you don't just list the hypotheses, and then start to reason. What you do is trial and error, experimentation, guesswork. You want to find out what the facts are, and what you do is in that respect similar to what a laboratory technician does."

== History ==
Mathematicians have always practiced experimental mathematics. Existing records of early mathematics, such as Babylonian mathematics, typically consist of lists of numerical examples illustrating algebraic identities. However, modern mathematics, beginning in the 17th century, developed a tradition of publishing results in a final, formal and abstract presentation. The numerical examples that may have led a mathematician to originally formulate a general theorem were not published, and were generally forgotten.

Experimental mathematics as a separate area of study re-emerged in the twentieth century, when the invention of the electronic computer vastly increased the range of feasible calculations, with a speed and precision far greater than anything available to previous generations of mathematicians. A significant milestone and achievement of experimental mathematics was the discovery in 1995 of the Bailey–Borwein–Plouffe formula for the binary digits of π. This formula was discovered not by formal reasoning, but instead by numerical searches on a computer; only afterwards was a rigorous proof found.

== Objectives and uses ==
The objectives of experimental mathematics are "to generate understanding and insight; to generate and confirm or confront conjectures; and generally to make mathematics more tangible, lively and fun for both the professional researcher and the novice".

The uses of experimental mathematics have been defined as follows:

1. Gaining insight and intuition.
2. Discovering new patterns and relationships.
3. Using graphical displays to suggest underlying mathematical principles.
4. Testing and especially falsifying conjectures.
5. Exploring a possible result to see if it is worth formal proof.
6. Suggesting approaches for formal proof.
7. Replacing lengthy hand derivations with computer-based derivations.
8. Confirming analytically derived results.

== Tools and techniques ==
Experimental mathematics makes use of numerical methods to calculate approximate values for integrals and infinite series. Arbitrary precision arithmetic is often used to establish these values to a high degree of precision – typically 100 significant figures or more. Integer relation algorithms are then used to search for relations between these values and mathematical constants. Working with high precision values reduces the possibility of mistaking a mathematical coincidence for a true relation. A formal proof of a conjectured relation will then be sought – it is often easier to find a formal proof once the form of a conjectured relation is known.

If a counterexample is being sought or a large-scale proof by exhaustion is being attempted, distributed computing techniques may be used to divide the calculations between multiple computers.

Frequent use is made of general mathematical software or domain-specific software written for attacks on problems that require high efficiency. Experimental mathematics software usually includes error detection and correction mechanisms, integrity checks and redundant calculations designed to minimise the possibility of results being invalidated by a hardware or software error.

== Applications and examples ==
Applications and examples of experimental mathematics include:

- Searching for a counterexample to a conjecture
  - Roger Frye used experimental mathematics techniques to find the smallest counterexample to Euler's sum of powers conjecture.
  - The ZetaGrid project was set up to search for a counterexample to the Riemann hypothesis.
  - Tomás Oliveira e Silva searched for a counterexample to the Collatz conjecture.
- Finding new examples of numbers or objects with particular properties
  - The Great Internet Mersenne Prime Search is searching for new Mersenne primes.
  - The Great Periodic Path Hunt is searching for new periodic paths.
  - distributed.net's OGR project searched for optimal Golomb rulers.
  - The PrimeGrid project is searching for the smallest Riesel and Sierpiński numbers.
- Finding serendipitous numerical patterns
  - Edward Lorenz found the Lorenz attractor, an early example of a chaotic dynamical system, by investigating anomalous behaviours in a numerical weather model.
  - The Ulam spiral was discovered by accident.
  - The pattern in the Ulam numbers was discovered by accident.
  - Mitchell Feigenbaum's discovery of the Feigenbaum constant was based initially on numerical observations, followed by a rigorous proof.
- Use of computer programs to check a large but finite number of cases to complete a computer-assisted proof by exhaustion
  - Thomas Hales's proof of the Kepler conjecture.
  - Various proofs of the four colour theorem.
  - Clement Lam's proof of the non-existence of a finite projective plane of order 10.
  - Gary McGuire proved a minimum uniquely solvable Sudoku requires 17 clues.
- Symbolic validation (via computer algebra) of conjectures to motivate the search for an analytical proof
  - Solutions to a special case of the quantum three-body problem known as the hydrogen molecule-ion were found using standard quantum chemistry basis sets before realizing they all lead to the same unique analytical solution in terms of a generalization of the Lambert W function. Related to this work is the isolation of a previously unknown link between gravity theory and quantum mechanics in lower dimensions (see quantum gravity and references therein).
  - In the realm of relativistic many-bodied mechanics, namely the time-symmetric Wheeler–Feynman absorber theory: the equivalence between an advanced Liénard–Wiechert potential of particle j acting on particle i and the corresponding potential for particle i acting on particle j was demonstrated exhaustively to order $1/c^{10}$ before being proved mathematically. The Wheeler-Feynman theory has regained interest because of quantum nonlocality.
  - In the realm of linear optics, verification of the series expansion of the envelope of the electric field for ultrashort light pulses travelling in non isotropic media. Previous expansions had been incomplete: the outcome revealed an extra term vindicated by experiment.
- Evaluation of infinite series, infinite products and integrals (also see symbolic integration), typically by carrying out a high precision numerical calculation, and then using an integer relation algorithm (such as the Inverse Symbolic Calculator) to find a linear combination of mathematical constants that matches this value. For example, the following identity was rediscovered by Enrico Au-Yeung, a student of Jonathan Borwein using computer search and PSLQ algorithm in 1993:

$$\begin{align}
\sum_{k=1}^\infty \frac{H_k^2}{k^2}=
\sum_{k=1}^\infty \frac{1}{k^2}\left(\underbrace{1+\frac{1}{2}+\frac{1}{3}+\cdots+\frac{1}{k}}_{H_k}\right)^2 = \frac{17\pi^4}{360}
\end{align}$$

- Visual investigations
  - In Indra's Pearls, David Mumford and others investigated various properties of Möbius transformation and the Schottky group using computer generated images of the groups which: furnished convincing evidence for many conjectures and lures to further exploration.

== Plausible but false examples ==
Some plausible relations hold to a high degree of accuracy, but are still not true. One example is:

$$\int_{0}^{\infty}\cos(2x)\prod_{n=1}^{\infty}\cos\left(\frac{x}{n}\right)\mathrm{d}x = \frac{\pi}{8}.$$

The two sides of this expression actually differ after the 42nd decimal place; the left-hand side is smaller by approximately 7.4×10^{−43}.

Another example is that the maximum height (maximum absolute value of coefficients) of all the factors of x^{n} − 1 appears to be the same as the height of the nth cyclotomic polynomial. This was shown by computer to be true for n < 10000 and was expected to be true for all n. However, a larger computer search showed that this equality fails to hold for n = 14235, when the height of the nth cyclotomic polynomial is 2, but maximum height of the factors is 3.

== Practitioners ==
The following mathematicians and computer scientists have made significant contributions to the field of experimental mathematics:

- Fabrice Bellard
- David H. Bailey
- Jonathan Borwein
- David Epstein
- Helaman Ferguson
- Ronald Graham
- Thomas Callister Hales
- Donald Knuth
- Clement Lam
- Oren Patashnik
- Simon Plouffe
- Eric Weisstein
- Stephen Wolfram
- Doron Zeilberger
- A.J. Han Vinck

== See also ==
- Borwein integral
- Computer-aided proof
- Proofs and Refutations
- Experimental Mathematics (journal)
- Institute for Experimental Mathematics
