= Merten M. Hasse Prize =

Award for expository papers in mathematics

The Merten M. Hasse Prize is awarded every two years by the Mathematical Association of America (MAA) to recognize an exceptional expository paper appearing in an MAA publication, at least one of whose authors is a younger mathematician, generally under the age of forty. First awarded in 1987, the prize honors inspiring and dedicated teachers and encourages young mathematicians to take up the challenge of exposition and communication.

== Recipients ==
The recipients of the Merten M. Hasse Prize are:

- 2023: Matt Davis, Adam E. Parker, and Daniel A. N. Vargas
- 2021: Zvi Rosen, Jessica Sidman, and Louis Theran
- 2019: David Treeby
- 2017: Lasse Rempe-Gillen and Zhaiming Shen
- 2015: Charles Doran and Ursula Whitcher
- 2013: Henryk Gerlach and Heiko von der Mosel
- 2011: Alissa S. Crans, Thomas M. Fiore, and Ramon Satyendra
- 2009: Andrew Bashelor, Amy Ksir, and Will Traves
- 2007: Franklin Mendivil
- 2005: Maureen T. Carroll and Steven T. Dougherty
- 2003: Manjul Bhargava
- 2001: Francis Edward Su
- 1999: Aleksandar Jurisic
- 1997: Jonathan King
- 1995: Andrew Granville
- 1993: David H. Bailey, Jonathan M. Borwein, and Peter B. Borwein
- 1991: Barry Arthur Cipra
- 1989: Irl Bivens
- 1987: Anthony Barcellos

== See also ==
- List of mathematics awards
