= Inverse Symbolic Calculator =

Numerical utility

- The Inverse Symbolic Calculator 2.0 homepage
- Website: http://wayback.cecm.sfu.ca/projects/ISC/ISCmain.html
- Commercial: No
- Current status: Down (as of 28/12/2024)

The Inverse Symbolic Calculator is an online number checker established July 18, 1995 by Peter Benjamin Borwein, Jonathan Michael Borwein and Simon Plouffe of the Canadian Centre for Experimental and Constructive Mathematics (Burnaby, Canada). A user will input a number and the Calculator will use an algorithm to search for and calculate closed-form expressions or suitable functions that have roots near this number. Hence, the calculator is of great importance for those working in numerical areas of experimental mathematics.

The ISC contains 54 million mathematical constants. Plouffe's Inverter (opened in 1998) contains 214 million. A newer version of the tables with 3.702 billion entries (as of June 19, 2010) exists.

In 2016, Plouffe released a portable version of Plouffe's Inverter containing 3 billion entries.

== Literature ==
- John Conway, Richard K. Guy: Zahlenzauber (The Book of Numbers), End of Chapter 1 about Numbers in languages. Birkhäuser, 1997, ISBN 3-7643-5244-2.

== See also ==
- On-Line Encyclopedia of Integer Sequences
