= David H. Bailey (mathematician) =

American mathematician (born 1948)

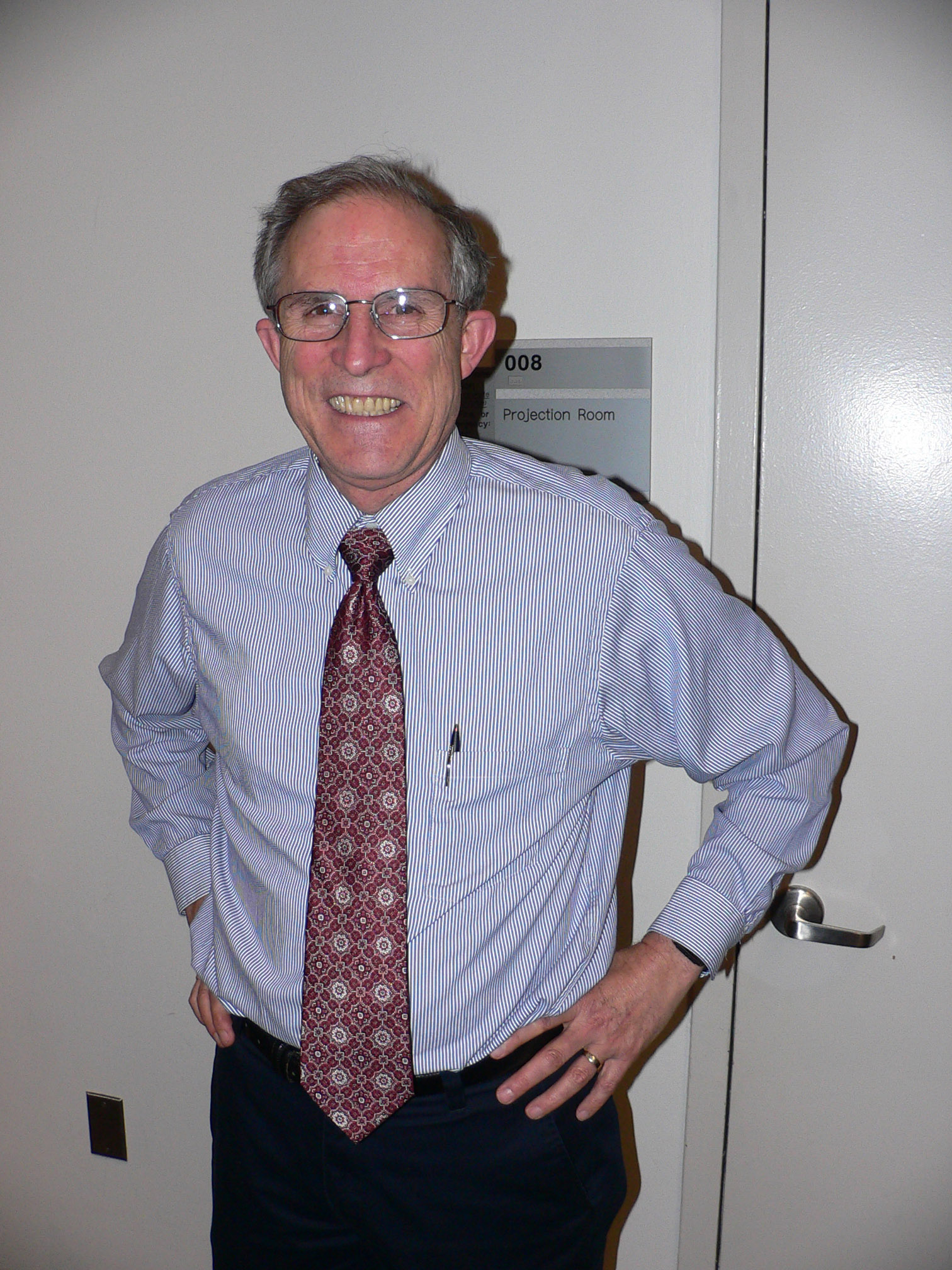
- Bailey in 2010
- Born: David Harold Bailey; 1948 (age 77–78)
- Education: Brigham Young University; Stanford University
- Known for: Bailey–Borwein–Plouffe formula
- Awards: Sidney Fernbach Award (1993); Chauvenet Prize (1993); Gordon Bell Prize (2008); Levi L. Conant Prize (2017)
- Scientific career
- Fields: Computer science Experimental mathematics
- Workplaces: Lawrence Berkeley National Laboratory (Retired)
- Doctoral advisor: Donald Samuel Ornstein

David Harold Bailey (born 14 August 1948) is a mathematician and computer scientist. He received his B.S. in mathematics from Brigham Young University in 1972 and his Ph.D. in mathematics from Stanford University in 1976. He worked for 14 years as a computer scientist at NASA Ames Research Center, and then from 1998 to 2013 as a Senior Scientist at the Lawrence Berkeley National Laboratory. He is now retired from the Berkeley Lab.

Bailey is perhaps best known as a co-author (with Peter Borwein and Simon Plouffe) of a 1997 paper that presented a new formula for π (pi), which had been discovered by Plouffe in 1995. This Bailey–Borwein–Plouffe formula permits one to calculate binary or hexadecimal digits of pi beginning at an arbitrary position, by means of a simple algorithm. Subsequently, Bailey and Richard Crandall showed that the existence of this and similar formulas has implications for the long-standing question of "normality"—whether and why the digits of certain mathematical constants (including pi) appear "random" in a particular sense.

Bailey was a long-time collaborator with Jonathan Borwein (Peter's brother). They co-authored five books and over 80 technical papers on experimental mathematics.

Bailey also does research in numerical analysis and parallel computing. He has published studies on the fast Fourier transform (FFT), high-precision arithmetic, and the PSLQ algorithm (used for integer relation detection). He is a co-author of the NAS Benchmarks, which are used to assess and analyze the performance of parallel scientific computers. A "4-step" method of calculating the FFT is widely known as Bailey's FFT algorithm (Bailey himself credits it to W. M. Gentleman and G. Sande).

He has also published articles in the area of mathematical finance, including a 2014 paper "Pseudo-mathematics and financial charlatanism," which emphasizes the dangers of statistical overfitting and other abuses of mathematics in the financial field.

In 1993, Bailey received the Sidney Fernbach award from the IEEE Computer Society, as well as the Chauvenet Prize and the Hasse Prize from the Mathematical Association of America. In 2008 he was a co-recipient of the Gordon Bell Prize from the Association for Computing Machinery. In 2017 he was a co-recipient of the Levi L. Conant Prize from the American Mathematical Society.

Bailey is a member of the Church of Jesus Christ of Latter-day Saints. He has positioned himself as an advocate of the teaching of science and that accepting the conclusions of modern science is not incompatible with a religious view.

== Selected works ==
- Bailey, D. H. (1990). "FFTs in external or hierarchical memory" (PDF). Journal of Supercomputing. 4 (1): 23–35. doi:10.1007/BF00162341.
- with Peter B. Borwein and Simon Plouffe: Bailey, David; Borwein, Peter; Plouffe, Simon (1997). "On the rapid computation of various polylogarithmic constants". Mathematics of Computation. 66 (1): 903–913. Bibcode:1997MaCom..66..903B. doi:10.1090/S0025-5718-97-00856-9. hdl:2060/19970009337.
- with Michał Misiurewicz: Bailey, David H.; Misiurewicz, Michał\ (2006). "A strong hot spot theorem". Proc. Amer. Math. Soc. 134 (9): 2495–2501. doi:10.1090/s0002-9939-06-08551-0. MR 2213726.
- with Jonathan Borwein, Marcos Lopez de Prado and Qiji Jim Zhu: Bailey, David H.; Borwein, Jonathan M.; López De Prado, Marcos; Zhu, Qiji Jim (2014). "Pseudo-mathematics and financial charlatanism: The effects of backtest overfitting on out-of-sample performance". Notices of the AMS. 61 (5): 458–471. doi:10.1090/noti1105.
- with Jonathan Borwein: Mathematics by experiment: Plausible reasoning in the 21st century, A. K. Peters 2004, 2008 (with accompanying CD Experiments in Mathematics, 2006)
- with Jonathan Borwein, Neil Calkin, Roland Girgensohn, D. Russell Luke, Victor Moll: Experimental mathematics in action, A. K. Peters 2007
- with Jonathan Borwein, Roland Girgensohn: Experimentation in mathematics: Computational paths to discovery, A. K. Peters 2004
- with Robert F. Lucas, Samuel Williams (eds.): Performance tuning of scientific applications. Chapman & Hall/CRC Computational Science Series, CRC Press 2010, ISBN 9781439815694.

== Sources ==
- Bailey, D. H. (March 1989). "FFTS in external or hierarchical memory". Proceedings of the 1989 ACM/IEEE conference on Supercomputing – Supercomputing '89. Vol. 4. ACM Press. pp. 23–35. doi:10.1145/76263.76288. ISBN 0-89791-341-8. S2CID 52809390.
