= Tamás Erdélyi =

Tamás Erdélyi may refer to:

- Tommy Ramone (born Tamás Erdély), musician and member of the Ramones
- Tamás Erdélyi (mathematician)
