= Peter Borwein =

Canadian mathematician (1953–2020)

Peter Benjamin Borwein (born St. Andrews, Scotland, May 10, 1953 – 23 August 2020) was a Canadian mathematician and a professor at Simon Fraser University. He is known as a co-author of the paper which presented the Bailey–Borwein–Plouffe algorithm (discovered by Simon Plouffe) for computing π.

== First interest in mathematics ==
Borwein was born into a Jewish family. He became interested in number theory and classical analysis during his second year of university. He had not previously been interested in math, although his father was the head of the University of Western Ontario's mathematics department and his mother is associate dean of medicine there. Borwein and his two siblings majored in mathematics.

== Academic career ==
After completing a Bachelor of Science in Honours Math at the University of Western Ontario in 1974, he went on to complete an MSc and Ph.D. at the University of British Columbia. He joined the Department of Mathematics at Dalhousie University. While he was there, he, his brother Jonathan Borwein and David H. Bailey of NASA wrote the 1989 paper that outlined and popularized a proof for computing one billion digits of π. The authors won the 1993 Chauvenet Prize and Merten M. Hasse Prize for this paper.

In 1993, he moved to Simon Fraser University, joining his brother Jonathan in establishing the Centre for Experimental and Constructive Mathematics (CECM) where he developed the Inverse Symbolic Calculator.

== Research ==
In 1995, the Borweins collaborated with Yasumasa Kanada of the University of Tokyo to compute π to more than four billion digits.

Borwein has developed an algorithm that applies Chebyshev polynomials to the Dirichlet eta function to produce a very rapidly convergent series suitable for high precision numerical calculations, which he published on the occasion of the awarding of an honorary doctorate to his brother, Jonathan.

Peter Borwein also collaborated with NASA's David Bailey and the Université du Québec's Simon Plouffe to calculate the individual hexadecimal digits of π. This provided a way for mathematicians to determine the nth digit of π without calculating preceding digits. In 2007 with Tamás Erdélyi, Ronald Ferguson, and Richard Lockhart he settled Littlewood's Problem 22.

== Affiliations ==
A former professor at Simon Fraser University, Peter Borwein was affiliated with Interdisciplinary Research in the Mathematical and Computational Sciences (IRMACS), Centre for Experimental and Constructive Mathematics (CECM), Mathematics of Information Technology and Complex Systems (MITACS), and Pacific Institute for the Mathematical Sciences (PIMS).

== Personal life and death ==
Borwein was diagnosed with multiple sclerosis prior to 2000. He died on 23 August 2020 of pneumonia as a result of his MS.

== Publications ==
As a co-author, Borwein has written Pi: A Source Book (with Lennart Berggren and Jonathan Borwein, 2000), Polynomials and Polynomial Inequalities (with Tamas Erdelyi, 1998), Pi and the AGM (1987; reprinted in 1998), A Dictionary of Real Numbers (with Jonathan Borwein), Computational Excursions in Analysis and Number Theory (2002), The Riemann Hypothesis: A Resource for the Afficionado and Virtuoso Alike (with Stephen Choi, Brendan Rooney, and Andrea Weirathmueller, 2007). He and his brother, Jonathan, co-edited the Canadian Mathematical Society/Springer-Verlag series of Books in Mathematics. In 2002 Peter Borwein, with Loki Jorgenson, won a Lester R. Ford Award for their expository article Visible Structures in Number Theory.

== See also ==
- Bailey–Borwein–Plouffe formula
- Erdős–Borwein constant
- David Borwein (father and mathematician)
- Jonathan Borwein (brother and mathematician)
