= Tamás Erdélyi (mathematician) =

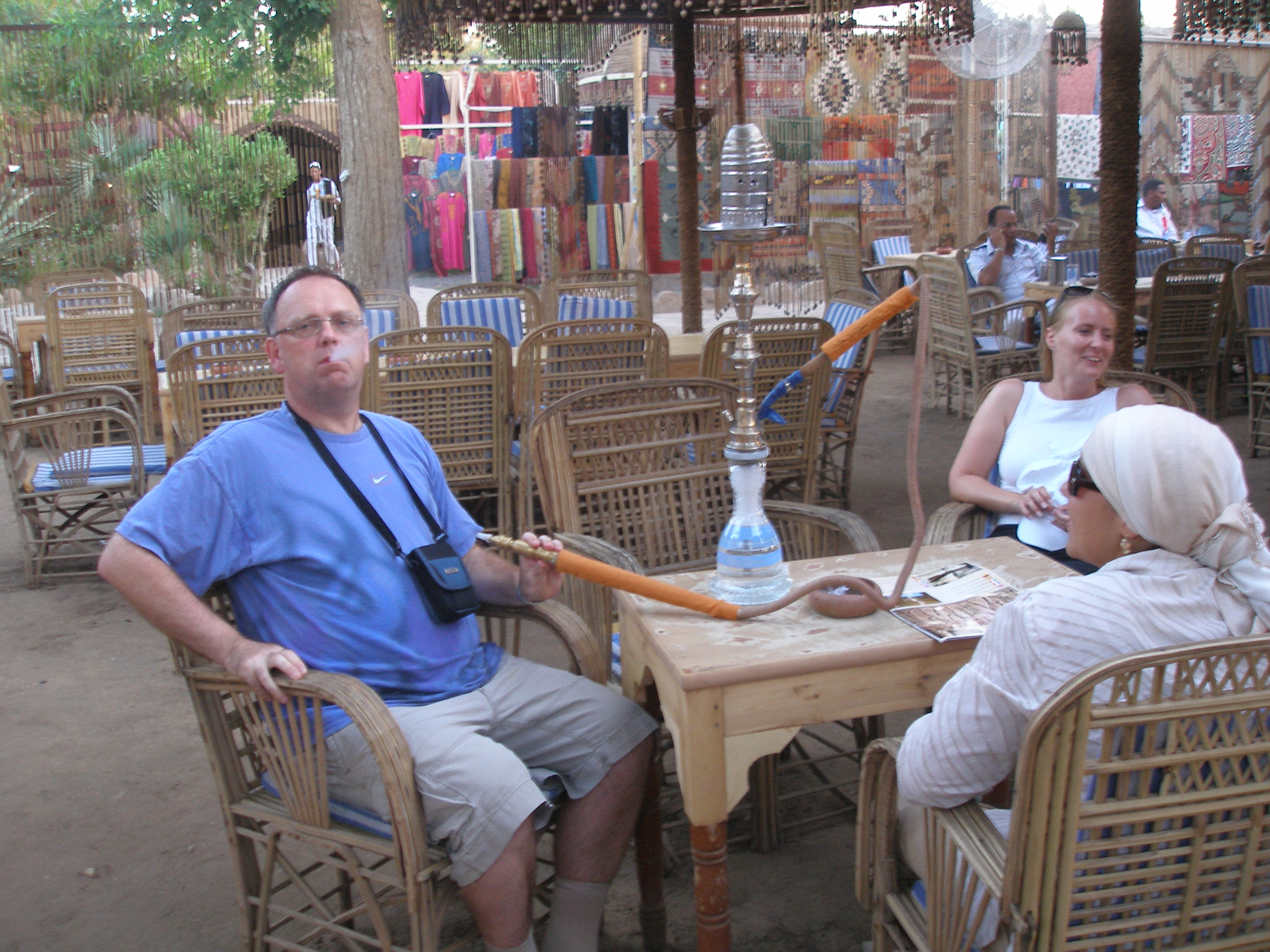
- Born: September 13, 1961 (age 64); Hungary
- Education: ELTE
- Known for: Polynomials, Approximation
- Scientific career
- Fields: Mathematics
- Workplaces: Texas A&M

Tamás Erdélyi is a Hungarian-born mathematician working at Texas A&M University. His main areas of research are related to polynomials and their approximations, although he also works in other areas of applied mathematics.

== Life, education and positions ==
Tamás Erdélyi was born on September 13, 1961, in Budapest, Hungary. From 1980 to 1985 he studied mathematics at the ELTE in Budapest, where he received his diploma. After graduation, he worked for two years as a research assistant at the Mathematics Institute of the Hungarian Academy of Sciences. He later pursued his graduate studies at the University of South Carolina (1987–88) and the Ohio State University (1988–89). He received his Ph.D. from the University of South Carolina in 1989. He was a postdoctoral fellow at the Ohio State University (1989–92), Dalhousie University (1992–93), Simon Fraser University (1993–95), and finally at the University of Copenhagen (1996–97). In 1995, he started to work at the Texas A&M University in College Station, Texas, where he is a professor of mathematics.

== Works ==
Erdélyi started his career studying Markov and Bernstein inequalities for constrained polynomials in the late eighties. In his Ph.D. dissertation he extended many important polynomial inequalities to generalized polynomials by writing the generalized degree in place of the ordinary. His trigonometric work on Remez inequality represents one of his most cited papers.

In 1995, he finished his Springer-Verlag graduate text Polynomials and Polynomial Inequalities, co-authored with Peter Borwein, and including an appendix proving the irrationality of ζ(2) and ζ(3). Later that year he showed that Müntz's theorem holds on every compact subset of the positive real axis of the Lebesgue measure. His bounded Remez-type inequality for Müntz polynomials in the non-dense case also allowed him to resolve Newman's product problem. In the same year he also proved a Bernstein's inequality for exponential sums, the subject of an earlier conjecture by G.G. Lorentz.

Erdélyi has also published papers dealing with other important inequalities for exponential sums and linear combinations of shifted Gaussians. Early in the twenty-first century he proved two of Saffari's conjectures, the phase problem and the near orthogonality conjecture. In 2007, working with Borwein, Ferguson, and Lockhart, he settled Littlewood's Problem 22. He is an expert on ultraflat and flat sequences of unimodular polynomials, having published papers on the location of zeros for polynomials with constrained coefficients, and on orthogonal polynomials. He has also made significant contributions to the integer Chebyshev problem, worked with Harvey Friedman on recursion theory, and, together with Borwein, disproved a conjecture made by the Chudnovsky brothers.

Erdélyi's more recent work has focused on problems in the interface of harmonic analysis and number theory, and the Mahler measure of constrained polynomials. In 2013 he proved that the Mahler measure and the maximum norm of the Rudin-Shapiro polynomials on the unit circle have the same size. He contributed substantially to Chowla's cosine problem by proving Bourgain and Ruzsa type results for the maximum and minimum of Littlewood cosine polynomials. One of his Bernstein type inequalities for rational functions is now referred to as the Borwein–Erdélyi inequality. He is also known for establishing the full Müntz theorem with Borwein and Johnson, and has some partial results related to questions raised by Paul Erdős.

In 2017 he proved Saffari's longstanding conjecture stating that the Mahler measure of the Rudin-Shapiro polynomials of degree n is asymptotically (2n/e)^{1/2}.
