= Erdős–Borwein constant =

Sum of the reciprocal of the Mersenne numbers

The Erdős–Borwein constant, named after Paul Erdős and Peter Borwein, is the sum of the reciprocals of the Mersenne numbers.

By definition it is:

$E=\sum_{n=1}^{\infty}\frac{1}{2^n-1}\approx1.606695152415291763\dots$

== Equivalent forms ==
It can be proven that the following forms all sum to the same constant:

$$E=\sum_{n=1}^{\infty}\frac{1}{2^{n^2}}\frac{2^n+1}{2^n-1}$$

$$E=\sum_{m=1}^{\infty}\sum_{n=1}^{\infty} \frac{1}{2^{mn}}$$

$$E=1+\sum_{n=1}^{\infty} \frac{1}{2^n(2^n-1)}$$

$$E=\sum_{n=1}^{\infty}\frac{\sigma_0(n)}{2^n}$$

where σ_{0}(n) = d(n) is the divisor function, a multiplicative function that equals the number of positive divisors of the number n. To prove the equivalence of these sums, note that they all take the form of Lambert series and can thus be resummed as such.

== Irrationality ==
In 1948, Erdős showed that the constant E is an irrational number. Later, Borwein provided an alternative proof.

Despite its irrationality, the binary representation of the Erdős–Borwein constant may be calculated efficiently.

== Applications ==
The Erdős–Borwein constant comes up in the average case analysis of the heapsort algorithm, where it controls the constant factor in the running time for converting an unsorted array of items into a heap.
