= Jonathan Borwein =

Scottish mathematician (1951–2016)

Jonathan Michael Borwein
- Born: 20 May 1951; St. Andrews, Scotland
- Died: 2 August 2016 (aged 65); London, Ontario, Canada
- Education: University of Western Ontario; University of Oxford
- Known for: Experimental mathematics, expert on pi, optimization, number theory, functional analysis
- Father: David Borwein
- Relatives: Peter Borwein (brother)
- Scientific career
- Fields: Mathematics
- Workplaces: Dalhousie University; University of Waterloo; Simon Fraser University; University of Newcastle, Australia
- Thesis: Optimization with respect to partial orderings (1974)

Jonathan Michael Borwein (20 May 1951 – 2 August 2016) was a Scottish mathematician who held an appointment as Laureate Professor of mathematics at the University of Newcastle, Australia. He was a close associate of David H. Bailey, and they have been prominent public advocates of experimental mathematics.

Borwein's interests spanned pure mathematics (analysis), applied mathematics (optimization), computational mathematics (numerical and computational analysis), and high performance computing. He authored ten books, including several on experimental mathematics, a monograph on convex functions, and over 400 refereed articles. He was a co-founder in 1995 of software company MathResources, consulting and producing interactive software primarily for school and university mathematics. He was not associated with MathResources at the time of his death.

Borwein was also an expert on the number pi and especially its computation.

== Early life and education ==
Borwein was born in St. Andrews, Scotland, in 1951 into a Jewish family. His father was mathematician David Borwein, with whom he collaborated. His brother Peter Borwein was also a mathematician.

Borwein was married to Judith (née Roots), and had three daughters.

He received his B.A. (Honours Math) from University of Western Ontario in 1971, and his PhD from Oxford University in 1974 as a Rhodes Scholar at Jesus College.

== Career ==
Prior to joining Simon Fraser University in 1993, he worked at Dalhousie University (1974–91), Carnegie-Mellon (1980–82) and the University of Waterloo (1991–93). He was Shrum Professor of Science (1993–2003) and a Canada Research Chair in Information Technology (2001–08) at Simon Fraser University, where he was founding Director of the Centre for Experimental and Constructive Mathematics and developed the Inverse Symbolic Calculator together with his brother and Simon Plouffe. In 2004, he rejoined the Faculty of Computer Science at Dalhousie University as a Canada Research Chair in Distributed and Collaborative Research, cross-appointed in Mathematics, while preserving an adjunct appointment at Simon Fraser.

Borwein was Governor at large of the Mathematical Association of America (2004–07), was president of the Canadian Mathematical Society (2000–02) and chair of (the Canadian National Science Library) NRC-CISTI Advisory Board (2000–2003). He served as chair of various NATO scientific programs. He was also Chair of the Scientific Advisory Committee of the Australian Mathematical Sciences Institute (AMSI). He chaired the Canadian HPC consortium, later Compute Canada, and the International Mathematical Union's Committee on Electronic Information and Communications (2002–2008).

== Awards ==
Borwein received various awards including the Chauvenet Prize (1993), Fellowship in the Royal Society of Canada (1994), Fellowship in the American Association for the Advancement of Science (2002), an honorary degree from Limoges (1999), and foreign membership in the Bulgarian Academy of Sciences (2003). He was elected as a Fellow to the Australian Academy of Science (2010). In 2014, he became a Fellow of the American Mathematical Society. He was an ISI highly cited mathematician for the period 1981–1999.

== See also ==
- Borwein integral
- Borwein's algorithm
- List of University of Waterloo people
