= Saffari =

Saffari (Persian: صفاری) can be both a middle name and a surname. Notable people with the name include:

- Morteza Saffari Natanzi (1956–2019), Iranian diplomat and politician
- Morteza Saffari, Iranian admiral
- Siavash Saffari, Iranian political scientist
