= David Borwein =

Canadian mathematician (1924–2021)

David Borwein (March 24, 1924 – September 3, 2021) was a Lithuanian-born Canadian mathematician, known for his research in the summability theory of series and integrals. He also did work in measure theory and probability theory, number theory, and approximate subgradients and coderivatives. He latterly collaborated with his son, Jonathan Borwein, and with B.A. Mares Jr. on the properties of single-variable and many-variable sinc integrals.

== Biography ==
Borwein was born in March 1924 in Lithuania to an Ashkenazi Jewish family. He formerly resided and worked in St. Andrews, Scotland, before moving to London, Ontario where he eventually became Head of Mathematics at the University of Western Ontario. He was also the president of the Canadian Mathematical Society (CMS). The David Borwein Distinguished Career Award given out by the CMS is named after him. He was an active researcher in summability theory, classical analysis, inequalities, matrix transformations, and was professor emeritus at the University of Western Ontario, department of Mathematics.

His wife of over 60 years, Bessie Borwein, is a prominent anatomist, and is professor emerita of anatomy at the University of Western Ontario.

In 2018 the Canadian Mathematical Society listed him in their inaugural class of fellows.

Borwein died in his sleep on September 3, 2021, at the age of 97.

== See also ==
- Borwein integral
- Jonathan Borwein (son and co-researcher)
- Peter Borwein (son and mathematician)
