= Pi =

Number, approximately 3.14

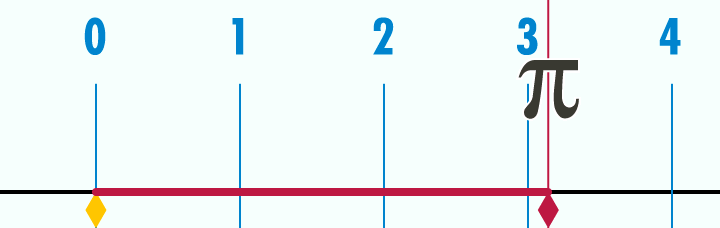
An illustration of the value of pi

The number π (/paɪ/; spelled out as pi) is a mathematical constant, approximately equal to 3.14159, that is the ratio of a circle's circumference to its diameter. It appears in many formulae across mathematics and physics, and some of these formulae are commonly used for defining π, to avoid relying on the definition of the length of a curve.

The number π is an irrational number, meaning that it cannot be expressed exactly as a ratio of two integers, although fractions such as 22/7 are commonly used to approximate it. Consequently, its decimal representation never ends, nor does it enter a permanently repeating pattern. It is a transcendental number, meaning that it cannot be a solution of an algebraic equation involving only finite sums, products, powers, and integers. The transcendence of π implies that it is impossible to solve the ancient problem of squaring the circle with a compass and straightedge. The decimal digits of π appear to be evenly distributed, but no proof of this conjecture has been found.

Mathematicians have long attempted to extend their understanding of π, sometimes by computing its value to a high degree of accuracy. Ancient civilizations, including the Egyptians and Babylonians, required fairly accurate approximations of π for practical computations. Around 250 BC, the Greek mathematician Archimedes created an algorithm to approximate π with arbitrary accuracy. In the 5th century AD, Chinese mathematicians approximated π to seven digits, while Indian mathematicians made a five-digit approximation, both using geometrical techniques. The first computational formula for π, based on infinite series, was discovered a millennium later. The development of calculus in the 17th century soon led to the calculation of hundreds of digits of π, enough for all practical scientific computations. Nevertheless, in the 20th and 21st centuries, mathematicians and computer scientists have extended the decimal representation of π to hundreds of trillions of digits.

Because it relates to a circle, π is found in formulae in trigonometry and geometry, especially those concerning circles, ellipses and spheres. It is found as well in formulae from cosmology, fractals, thermodynamics, mechanics, and electromagnetism. It also appears in areas such as number theory, statistics, and in modern mathematical analysis π is ubiquitous.

== Fundamentals ==
=== Name ===
The symbol used by mathematicians to represent the ratio of a circle's circumference to its diameter is the lowercase Greek letter π, sometimes spelled out as pi. In English, π is pronounced as "pie" (/paɪ/ PY). In mathematical use, the lowercase letter π is distinguished from its capitalized and enlarged counterpart Π, which denotes a product of a sequence, analogously to how Σ denotes summation.

=== Definition ===
The circumference of a circle is slightly more than three times as long as its diameter. The exact ratio is called π.

π is commonly defined as the ratio of a circle's circumference C to its diameter d:
$$\pi = \frac{C}{d}.$$
In Euclidean geometry, the ratio $\frac{C}{d}$ is constant, regardless of the circle's size. For example, if a circle has twice the diameter of another circle, it will also have twice the circumference, preserving the ratio $\frac{C}{d}$.

Here, the circumference of a circle is the arc length around the perimeter of the circle, a quantity which can be formally defined using limits – a concept in calculus. For example, one may directly compute the arc length of the top half of the unit circle, given in Cartesian coordinates by the equation $x^2+y^2=1$, as the integral:
$$\pi = \int_{-1}^1 \frac{dx}{\sqrt{1-x^2}}.$$

An integral such as this was proposed as a definition of π by Karl Weierstrass, who defined it directly as an integral in 1841. (Note: The specific integral that Weierstrass used was $$\pi=\int_{-\infty}^\infty\frac{dx}{1+x^2}.$$)

Integration is no longer commonly used in a first analytical definition because, as Remmert 2012 explains, differential calculus typically precedes integral calculus in the university curriculum, so it is desirable to have a definition of π that does not rely on the latter. One such definition, due to Richard Baltzer and popularized by Edmund Landau, is the following: π is twice the smallest positive number at which the cosine function equals 0. π is also the smallest positive number at which the sine function equals zero, and the difference between consecutive zeroes of the sine function. The cosine and sine can be defined independently of geometry as a power series, or as the solution of a differential equation.

In a similar spirit, π can be defined using properties of the complex exponential, exp z, of a complex variable z. Like the cosine, the complex exponential can be defined in one of several ways. The set of complex numbers at which exp z is equal to one is then an (imaginary) arithmetic progression of the form:
$$\{\dots,-2\pi i, 0, 2\pi i, 4\pi i,\dots\} = \{2\pi ki\mid k\in\mathbb Z\}$$
and there is a unique positive real number π with this property.

=== Irrationality and normality ===
π is an irrational number, meaning that it cannot be written as the ratio of two integers. Fractions such as 22/7 and 355/113 are commonly used to approximate π, but no common fraction (ratio of whole numbers) can be its exact value. Because π is irrational, it has an infinite number of digits in its decimal representation, and does not settle into an infinitely repeating pattern of digits. There are several proofs that π is irrational; they are generally proofs by contradiction and require calculus. The degree to which π can be approximated by rational numbers (called the irrationality measure) is not precisely known; estimates have established that the irrationality measure is larger or at least equal to the measure of e but smaller than the measure of Liouville numbers.

Unsolved problem in mathematics
Is $\pi$ a normal number?
More unsolved problems in mathematics

The digits of π have no apparent pattern and have passed tests for statistical randomness, including tests for normality; a number of infinite length is called normal when all possible sequences of digits (of any given length) appear equally often. The conjecture that π is normal has not been proven or disproven.

Since the advent of computers, a large number of digits of π have been available on which to perform statistical analysis. Yasumasa Kanada has performed detailed statistical analyses on the decimal digits of π, and found them consistent with normality; for example, the frequencies of the ten digits 0 to 9 were subjected to statistical significance tests, and no evidence of a pattern was found. Any random sequence of digits contains arbitrarily long subsequences that appear non-random, by the infinite monkey theorem. Thus, because the sequence of π's digits passes statistical tests for randomness, it contains some sequences of digits that may appear non-random, such as a sequence of six consecutive 9s that begins at the 762nd decimal place of the decimal representation of π.

=== Transcendence ===
Because π is a transcendental number, squaring the circle is not possible in a finite number of steps using the classical tools of compass and straightedge.

In addition to being irrational, π is also a transcendental number, which means that it is not the solution of any non-constant polynomial equation with rational coefficients, such as $\frac{x^5}{120}-\frac{x^3}{6}+x=0$. (Note: The polynomial shown is the first few terms of the Taylor series expansion of the sine function.) This follows from the Lindemann–Weierstrass theorem, which also establishes the transcendence of the constant e.

The transcendence of π has two important consequences: First, π cannot be expressed using any finite combination of rational numbers and square roots or nth roots (such as $\sqrt[3]{31}$ or $\sqrt{10}$). Second, since no transcendental number can be constructed with compass and straightedge, it is not possible to "square the circle". In other words, it is impossible to construct, using compass and straightedge alone, a square whose area is exactly equal to the area of a given circle. Squaring a circle was one of the important geometry problems of the classical antiquity. Amateur mathematicians in modern times have sometimes attempted to square the circle and claim success – despite the fact that it is mathematically impossible.

An unsolved problem thus far is the question of whether or not the numbers π and e are algebraically independent ("relatively transcendental"). This would be resolved by Schanuel's conjecture – a currently unproven generalization of the Lindemann–Weierstrass theorem.

=== Continued fractions ===
As an irrational number, π cannot be represented as a common fraction. However, like every number, π can be represented by an infinite series of nested fractions, called a simple continued fraction:

$$\pi = 3+\textstyle \cfrac{1}{7+\textstyle \cfrac{1}{15+\textstyle \cfrac{1}{1+\textstyle \cfrac{1}{292+\textstyle \cfrac{1}{1+\textstyle \cfrac{1}{1+\textstyle \cfrac{1}{1+\ddots}}}}}}}$$

Truncating the continued fraction at any point yields a rational approximation for π; the first four of these are 3, 22/7, 333/106, and 355/113. These numbers are among the best-known and most widely used historical approximations of the constant. Each approximation generated in this way is a best rational approximation; that is, each is closer to π than any other fraction with the same or a smaller denominator. Because π is transcendental, it is by definition not algebraic and so cannot be a quadratic irrational. Therefore, π cannot have a periodic continued fraction. Although the simple continued fraction for π (with numerators all 1, shown above) also does not exhibit any other obvious pattern, several non-simple continued fractions do, such as: (Note: The middle of these is due to the mid-17th century mathematician William Brouncker, see § Brouncker's formula.)

$$\begin{align}
\pi &= 3+ \cfrac
{1^2}{6+ \cfrac
{3^2}{6+ \cfrac
{5^2}{6+ \cfrac
{7^2}{6+ \ddots}}}}
= \cfrac
{4}{1+ \cfrac
{1^2}{2+ \cfrac
{3^2}{2+ \cfrac
{5^2}{2+ \ddots}}}}
= \cfrac
{4}{1+ \cfrac
{1^2}{3+ \cfrac
{2^2}{5+ \cfrac
{3^2}{7+ \ddots}}}}
\end{align}$$

=== Approximate value and digits ===
Some approximations of pi include:

- Integers: 3
- Fractions: Approximate fractions include (in order of increasing accuracy) 22/7, 333/106, 355/113, 52163/16604, 103993/33102, 104348/33215, and 245850922/78256779. (List is selected terms from OEIS: A063674 and OEIS: A063673.)
- Digits: The first 50 decimal digits are 3.14159265358979323846264338327950288419716939937510... (see OEIS: A000796)

Digits in other number systems

- The first 48 binary (base 2) digits (called bits) are 11.001001000011111101101010100010001000010110100011... (see OEIS: A004601)
- The first 36 digits in ternary (base 3) are 10.010211012222010211002111110221222220... (see OEIS: A004602)
- The first 20 digits in hexadecimal (base 16) are 3.243F6A8885A308D31319... (see OEIS: A062964)
- The first five sexagesimal (base 60) digits are 3;8,29,44,0,47 (see OEIS: A060707)

=== Complex numbers and Euler's identity ===
The association between imaginary powers of the number e and points on the unit circle centred at the origin in the complex plane given by Euler's formula

Any complex number, say z, can be expressed using a pair of real numbers. In the polar coordinate system, one number (radius or r) is used to represent z's distance from the origin of the complex plane, and the other (angle or φ) the counter-clockwise rotation from the positive real line:

$$z = r\cdot(\cos\varphi + i\sin\varphi),$$

where i is the imaginary unit satisfying $i^2=-1$. The frequent appearance of π in complex analysis can be related to the behaviour of the exponential function of a complex variable, described by Euler's formula:

$$e^{i\varphi} = \cos \varphi + i\sin \varphi,$$

where the constant e is the base of the natural logarithm. This formula establishes a correspondence between imaginary powers of e and points on the unit circle centred at the origin of the complex plane. Setting $\varphi=\pi$ in Euler's formula results in Euler's identity, celebrated in mathematics due to it containing five important mathematical constants:

$$e^{i \pi} + 1 = 0.$$

There are n different complex numbers z satisfying $z^n=1$, and these are called the "nth roots of unity" and are given by the formula:

$$e^{2 \pi i k/n} \qquad (k = 0, 1, 2, \dots, n - 1).$$

== History ==
Surviving approximations of π prior to the 2nd century CE are accurate to one or two decimal places at best. The earliest written approximations are found in Babylon and Egypt, both within one percent of the true value. In Babylon, a clay tablet dated 1900–1600 BCE has a geometrical statement that, by implication, treats π as 25/8 = 3.125. In Egypt, the Rhind Papyrus, dated around 1650 BCE but copied from a document dated to 1850 BCE, has a formula for the area of a circle that treats π as $\bigl(\frac{16}{9}\bigr)^2\approx3.16$. Although some pyramidologists have theorized that the Great Pyramid of Giza was built with proportions related to π, this theory is not widely accepted by scholars. In the Shulba Sutras of Indian mathematics, dating to an oral tradition from the 1st or 2nd millennium BCE, approximations are given which have been variously interpreted as approximately 3.08831, 3.08833, 3.004, 3, or 3.125.

=== Polygon approximation era ===
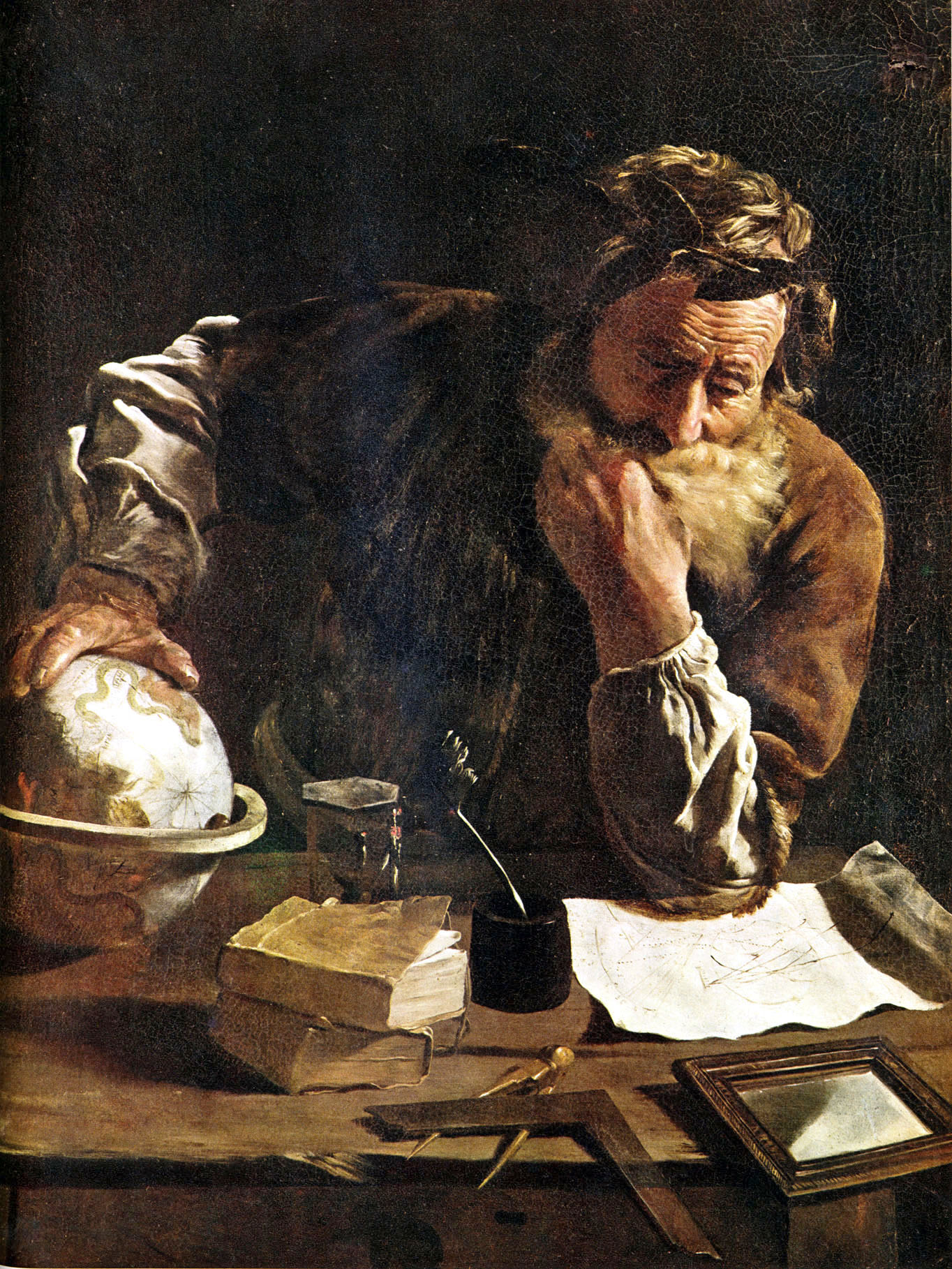
Archimedes developed the polygonal approach to approximating π.

π can be estimated by computing the perimeters of circumscribed and inscribed polygons.

The first recorded algorithm for rigorously calculating the value of π was a geometrical approach using polygons, devised around 250 BC by the Greek mathematician Archimedes, implementing the method of exhaustion. This polygonal algorithm dominated for over 1,000 years, and as a result π is sometimes referred to as Archimedes's constant. Archimedes computed upper and lower bounds of π by drawing a regular hexagon inside and outside a circle, and successively doubling the number of sides until he reached a 96-sided regular polygon. By calculating the perimeters of these polygons, he proved that 223/71 < π < 22/7 (that is, 3.1408 < π < 3.1429). Archimedes' upper bound of 22/7 may have led to a widespread popular belief that π is equal to 22/7. Around 150 AD, Greco-Roman scientist Ptolemy, in his Almagest, gave a value for π of 3.1416, which he may have obtained from Archimedes or from Apollonius of Perga.

In ancient China, values for π included 3.1547 (around 1 AD), $\sqrt{10}$ (100 AD, approximately 3.1623), and 142/45 (3rd century, approximately 3.1556). Around 265 AD, the Cao Wei mathematician Liu Hui created a polygon-based iterative algorithm, with which he constructed a 3,072-sided polygon to approximate π as 3.1416. Liu later invented a faster method of calculating π and obtained a value of 3.14 with a 96-sided polygon, by taking advantage of the fact that the differences in area of successive polygons form a geometric series with a factor of 4. Around 480 AD, Zu Chongzhi calculated that $3.1415926 < \pi < 3.1415927$ and suggested the approximations $\pi \approx \frac{355}{113} = 3.14159292035\ldots$ and $\pi \approx \frac{22}{7} = 3.142857142857\ldots$, which he termed the milü ('close ratio') and yuelü ('approximate ratio') respectively, iterating with Liu Hui's algorithm up to a 12,288-sided polygon. With a correct value for its seven first decimal digits, Zu's result remained the most accurate approximation of π for the next 800 years.

The Indian astronomer Aryabhata used a value of 3.1416 in his Āryabhaṭīya (499 AD). Around 1220, Fibonacci computed 3.1418 using a polygonal method devised independently of Archimedes. Italian author Dante apparently employed the value $3+\frac{\sqrt{2}}{10} \approx 3.14142$.

The Persian astronomer Jamshīd al-Kāshī produced nine sexagesimal digits, roughly the equivalent of 16 decimal digits, in 1424, using a polygon with $3\times 2^{28}$ sides, which stood as the world record for about 180 years. French mathematician François Viète in 1579 achieved nine digits with a polygon of $3\times 2^{17}$ sides. Flemish mathematician Adriaan van Roomen arrived at 15 decimal places in 1593. In 1596, Dutch mathematician Ludolph van Ceulen reached 20 digits, a record he later increased to 35 digits (as a result, π was called the "Ludolphian number" in Germany until the early 20th century). Dutch scientist Willebrord Snellius reached 34 digits in 1621, and Austrian astronomer Christoph Grienberger arrived at 38 digits in 1630 using 10^{40} sides. Christiaan Huygens was able to arrive at 10 decimal places in 1654 using a slightly different method equivalent to Richardson extrapolation.

=== Infinite series ===
Comparison of the convergence of several historical infinite series for π. S_{n} is the approximation after taking n terms. Each subsequent subplot magnifies the shaded area horizontally by 10 times. (click for detail)

The calculation of π was revolutionized by the development of infinite series techniques in the 16th and 17th centuries. An infinite series is the sum of the terms of an infinite sequence. Infinite series allowed mathematicians to compute π with much greater precision than Archimedes and others who used geometrical techniques. Although infinite series were exploited for π most notably by European mathematicians such as James Gregory and Gottfried Wilhelm Leibniz, the approach also appeared in the Kerala school sometime in the 14th or 15th century. Around 1500, an infinite series that could be used to compute π, written in the form of Sanskrit verse, was presented in Tantrasamgraha by Nilakantha Somayaji. The series are presented without proof, but proofs are presented in the later work Yuktibhāṣā, published around 1530. Several infinite series are described, including series for sine (which Nilakantha attributes to Madhava of Sangamagrama), cosine, and arctangent which are now sometimes referred to as Madhava series. The series for arctangent is sometimes called Gregory's series or the Gregory–Leibniz series. Madhava used infinite series to estimate π to 11 digits around 1400.

In 1593, François Viète published what is now known as Viète's formula, an infinite product (rather than an infinite sum, which is more typically used in π calculations):

$$\frac2\pi = \frac{\sqrt2}2 \cdot \frac{\sqrt{2+\sqrt2}}2 \cdot \frac{\sqrt{2+\sqrt{2+\sqrt2}}}2 \cdots$$

In 1655, John Wallis published what is now known as the Wallis product, also an infinite product:

$$\frac{\pi}{2} = \Big(\frac{2}{1} \cdot \frac{2}{3}\Big) \cdot \Big(\frac{4}{3} \cdot \frac{4}{5}\Big) \cdot \Big(\frac{6}{5} \cdot \frac{6}{7}\Big) \cdot \Big(\frac{8}{7} \cdot \frac{8}{9}\Big) \cdots$$

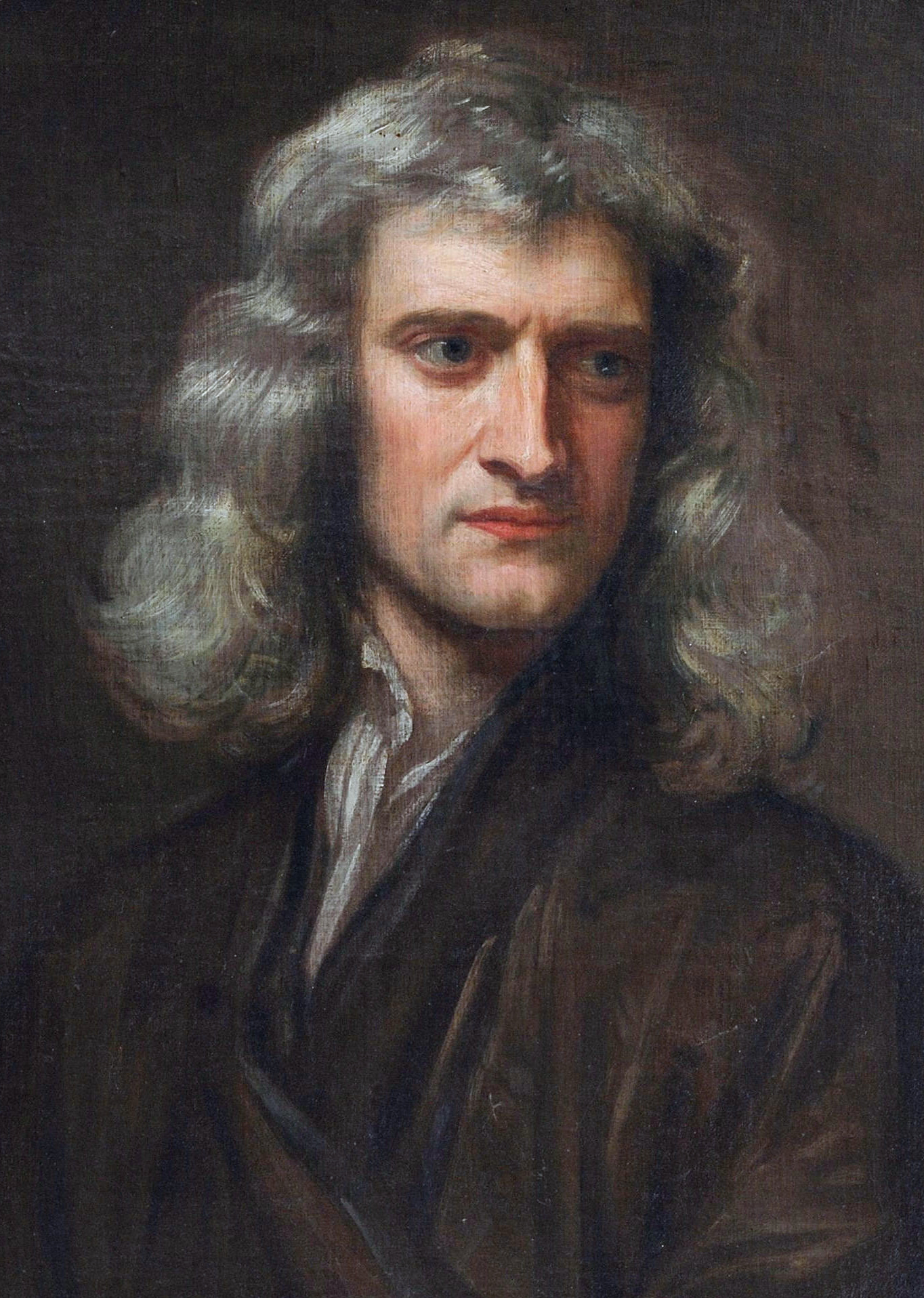
Isaac Newton used infinite series to compute π to 15 digits, later writing "I am ashamed to tell you to how many figures I carried these computations".

In the 1660s, the English scientist Isaac Newton and German mathematician Gottfried Wilhelm Leibniz discovered calculus, which led to the development of many infinite series for approximating π. Newton himself used an arcsine series to compute a 15-digit approximation of π in 1665 or 1666, writing, "I am ashamed to tell you to how many figures I carried these computations, having no other business at the time."

In 1671, James Gregory, and independently, Leibniz in 1673, discovered the Taylor series expansion for arctangent:

$$\arctan z = z - \frac {z^3} {3} +\frac {z^5} {5} -\frac {z^7} {7} +\cdots$$

This series, sometimes called the Gregory–Leibniz series, equals $\frac{\pi}{4}$ when evaluated with $z=1$. But for ${{{1}}}$, it converges impractically slowly (that is, approaches the answer very gradually), taking about ten times as many terms to calculate each additional digit.

In 1699, English mathematician Abraham Sharp used the Gregory–Leibniz series for $z=\frac{1}{\sqrt{3}}$ to compute π to 71 digits, breaking the previous record of 39 digits, which was set with a polygonal algorithm.

In 1706, John Machin used the Gregory–Leibniz series to produce an algorithm that converged much faster:

$$\frac{\pi}{4} = 4 \arctan \frac{1}{5} - \arctan \frac{1}{239}.$$

Machin reached 100 digits of π with this formula. Other mathematicians created variants, now known as Machin-like formulae, that were used to set several successive records for calculating digits of π.

Isaac Newton accelerated the convergence of the Gregory–Leibniz series in 1684 (in an unpublished work; others independently discovered the result):

$$\arctan x
= \frac{x}{1 + x^2} + \frac23\frac{x^3}{(1 + x^2)^2}
+ \frac{2\cdot 4}{3 \cdot 5}\frac{x^5}{(1 + x^2)^3} + \cdots$$

Leonhard Euler popularized this series in his 1755 differential calculus textbook, and later used it with Machin-like formulae, including $\tfrac\pi4 = 5\arctan\tfrac17 + 2\arctan\tfrac{3}{79},$ with which he computed 20 digits of π in one hour.

In 1844, a record was set by Zacharias Dase, who employed a Machin-like formula to calculate 200 decimals of π in his head at the behest of German mathematician Carl Friedrich Gauss. Machin-like formulae remained the best-known method for calculating π well into the age of computers, and were used to set records for 250 years, culminating in a 620-digit approximation in 1946 by Daniel Ferguson – the best approximation achieved without the aid of a calculating device.

In 1853, British mathematician William Shanks calculated π to 607 digits, but made a mistake in the 528th digit, rendering all subsequent digits incorrect. Though he calculated an additional 100 digits in 1873, bringing the total up to 707, his previous mistake rendered all the new digits incorrect as well.

==== Rate of convergence ====
Some infinite series for π converge faster than others. Given the choice of two infinite series for π, mathematicians will generally use the one that converges more rapidly because faster convergence reduces the amount of computation needed to calculate π to any given accuracy. A simple infinite series for π is the Gregory–Leibniz series:

$$\pi = \frac{4}{1} - \frac{4}{3} + \frac{4}{5} - \frac{4}{7} + \frac{4}{9} - \frac{4}{11} + \frac{4}{13} - \cdots$$

As individual terms of this infinite series are added to the sum, the total gradually gets closer to π, and – with a sufficient number of terms – can get as close to π as desired. It converges quite slowly, though – after 500,000 terms, it produces only five correct decimal digits of π.

An infinite series for π (published by Nilakantha in the 15th century) that converges more rapidly than the Gregory–Leibniz series is:

$$\pi = 3 + \frac{4}{2\times3\times4} - \frac{4}{4\times5\times6} + \frac{4}{6\times7\times8} - \frac{4}{8\times9\times10} + \cdots$$

The following table compares the convergence rates of these two series:

Infinite series for π	After 1st term	After 2nd term	After 3rd term	After 4th term	After 5th term	Converges to:
$\pi = \frac{4}{1} - \frac{4}{3} + \frac{4}{5} - \frac{4}{7} + \frac{4}{9} - \frac{4}{11} + \frac{4}{13} + \cdots$	4.0000	2.6666 ...	3.4666 ...	2.8952 ...	3.3396 ...	π = 3.1415 ...
$\pi = {{3}} + \frac{{4}}{2\times3\times4} - \frac{{4}}{4\times5\times6} + \frac{{4}}{6\times7\times8} - \cdots$	3.0000	3.1666 ...	3.1333 ...	3.1452 ...	3.1396 ...	π = 3.1415 ...

After five terms, the sum of the Gregory–Leibniz series is within 0.2 of the correct value of π, whereas the sum of Nilakantha's series is within 0.002 of the correct value. Nilakantha's series converges faster and is more useful for computing digits of π. Series that converge even faster include Machin's series and Chudnovsky's series, the latter producing 14 correct decimal digits per term.

=== Irrationality and transcendence ===
Not all mathematical advances relating to π were aimed at increasing the accuracy of approximations. When Euler solved the Basel problem in 1735, finding the exact value of the sum of the reciprocal squares, he established a connection between π and the prime numbers that later contributed to the development and study of the Riemann zeta function:

$$\frac{\pi^2}{6} = \frac{1}{1^2} + \frac{1}{2^2} + \frac{1}{3^2} + \frac{1}{4^2} + \cdots$$

Swiss scientist Johann Heinrich Lambert in 1768 proved that π is irrational, meaning it is not equal to the quotient of any two integers. Lambert's proof exploited a continued-fraction representation of the tangent function. French mathematician Adrien-Marie Legendre proved in 1794 that π^{2} is also irrational. In 1882, German mathematician Ferdinand von Lindemann proved that π is transcendental, confirming a conjecture made by both Legendre and Euler. (Note: Hardy and Wright state that "the proofs were afterwards modified and simplified by Hilbert, Hurwitz, and other writers". C.f. Hardy and Wright 1938 and 2000:177 footnote § 11.13–14. The proofs that e and π are transcendental can be found on pp. 170–176. They cite two sources of the proofs at Landau 1927 or Perron 1910; see the "List of Books" at pp. 417–419 for full citations.)

=== Adoption of the symbol ===
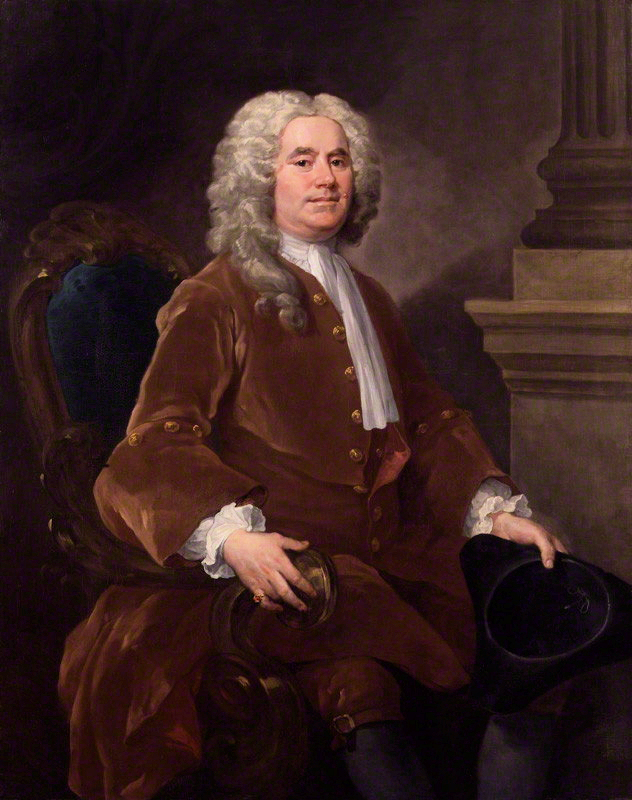
The earliest known use of the Greek letter π to represent the ratio of a circle's circumference to its diameter was by Welsh mathematician William Jones in 1706.

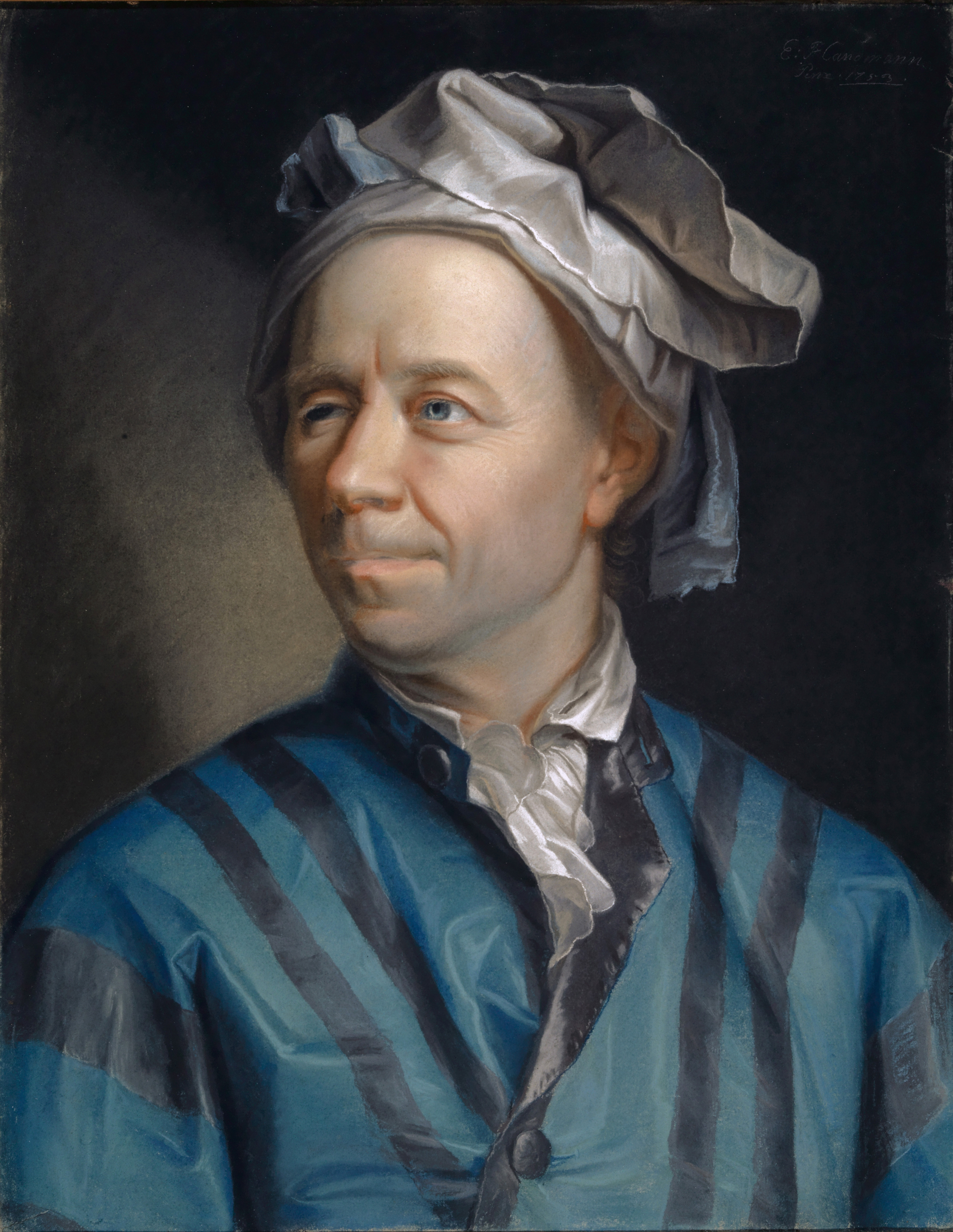
Leonhard Euler popularized the use of the Greek letter π in works he published in 1736 and 1748.

The first recorded use of the symbol π in circle geometry is in Oughtred's Clavis Mathematicae (1648), where the Greek letters π and δ were combined into the fraction $\tfrac \pi \delta$ for denoting the ratios semiperimeter to semidiameter and perimeter to diameter, that is, what is presently denoted as π. (Before then, mathematicians sometimes used letters such as c or p instead.) Barrow likewise used the same notation, while Gregory instead used $\frac \pi \rho$ to represent 6.28... .

The earliest known use of the Greek letter π alone to represent the ratio of a circle's circumference to its diameter was by Welsh mathematician William Jones in his 1706 work Synopsis Palmariorum Matheseos; or, a New Introduction to the Mathematics. The Greek letter appears on p. 243 in the phrase "$\tfrac12$ Periphery (π)", calculated for a circle with radius one. However, Jones writes that his equations for π are from the "ready pen of the truly ingenious Mr. John Machin", leading to speculation that Machin may have employed the Greek letter before Jones. Jones' notation was not immediately ied by other mathematicians, with the fraction notation still being used as late as 1767.

Euler started using the single-letter form beginning with his 1727 Essay Explaining the Properties of Air, though he used π = 6.28..., the ratio of periphery to radius, in this and some later writing. Euler first used π = 3.14... in his 1736 work Mechanica, and continued in his widely read 1748 work Introductio in analysin infinitorum (he wrote: "for the sake of brevity we will write this number as π; thus π is equal to half the circumference of a circle of radius 1"). Because Euler corresponded heavily with other mathematicians in Europe, the use of the Greek letter spread rapidly, and the practice was universally adopted thereafter in the Western world, though the definition still varied between 3.14... and 6.28... as late as 1761.

== Modern quest for more digits ==
=== Motives for computing ===
As mathematicians discovered new algorithms, and computers became available, the number of known decimal digits of π increased dramatically. The vertical scale is logarithmic.

For most numerical calculations involving π, a handful of digits provide sufficient precision. According to Jörg Arndt and Christoph Haenel, thirty-nine digits are sufficient to perform most cosmological calculations, because that is the accuracy necessary to calculate the circumference of the observable universe with a precision of one atom. Accounting for additional digits needed to compensate for computational round-off errors, Arndt concludes that a few hundred digits would suffice for any scientific application. Despite this, people have worked strenuously to compute π to thousands and millions of digits. This effort may be partly ascribed to the human compulsion to break records, and such achievements with π often make headlines around the world. They also have practical benefits, such as testing supercomputers, testing numerical analysis algorithms (including high-precision multiplication algorithms) – and within pure mathematics itself, providing data for evaluating the randomness of the digits of π.

=== Computer era and iterative algorithms ===
The development of computers in the mid-20th century again revolutionized the hunt for digits of π. Mathematicians John Wrench and Levi Smith reached 1,120 digits in 1949 using a desk calculator. Using an inverse tangent (arctan) infinite series, a team led by George Reitwiesner and John von Neumann that same year achieved 2,037 digits with a calculation that took 70 hours of computer time on the ENIAC computer. The record, always relying on an arctan series, was broken repeatedly (3,089 digits in 1955, 7,480 digits in 1957; 10,000 digits in 1958; 100,000 digits in 1961) until 1 million digits was reached in 1973.

Two additional developments around 1980 once again accelerated the ability to compute π. First, the discovery of new iterative algorithms for computing π, which were much faster than the infinite series; and second, the invention of fast multiplication algorithms that could multiply large numbers very rapidly. Such algorithms are particularly important in modern π computations because most of the computer's time is devoted to multiplication. They include the Karatsuba algorithm, Toom–Cook multiplication, and Fourier transform-based methods.

The Gauss–Legendre iterative algorithm:
Initialize
$$\textstyle a_0 = 1, \quad b_0 = \frac{1}{\sqrt 2}, \quad t_0 = \frac{1}{4}, \quad p_0 = 1.$$
Iterate
$$\textstyle a_{n+1} = \frac{a_n+b_n}{2}, \quad \quad b_{n+1} = \sqrt{a_n b_n},$$
$$\textstyle t_{n+1} = t_n - p_n (a_n-a_{n+1})^2, \quad \quad p_{n+1} = 2 p_n.$$
Then an estimate for π is given by
$$\textstyle \pi \approx \frac{(a_n + b_n)^2}{4 t_n}.$$

The iterative algorithms were independently published in 1975–1976 by physicist Eugene Salamin and scientist Richard Brent. These avoid reliance on infinite series. An iterative algorithm repeats a specific calculation, each iteration using the outputs from prior steps as its inputs, and produces a result in each step that converges to the desired value. The approach was actually invented over 160 years earlier by Carl Friedrich Gauss, in what is now termed the arithmetic–geometric mean method (AGM method) or Gauss–Legendre algorithm. As modified by Salamin and Brent, it is also referred to as the Brent–Salamin algorithm.

The iterative algorithms were widely used after 1980 because they are faster than infinite series algorithms: whereas infinite series typically increase the number of correct digits additively in successive terms, iterative algorithms generally multiply the number of correct digits at each step. For example, the Brent–Salamin algorithm doubles the number of digits in each iteration. In 1984, brothers John and Peter Borwein produced an iterative algorithm that quadruples the number of digits in each step; and in 1987, one that increases the number of digits five times in each step. Iterative methods were used by Japanese mathematician Yasumasa Kanada to set several records for computing π between 1995 and 2002. This rapid convergence comes at a price: the iterative algorithms require significantly more memory than infinite series.

=== Rapidly convergent series ===
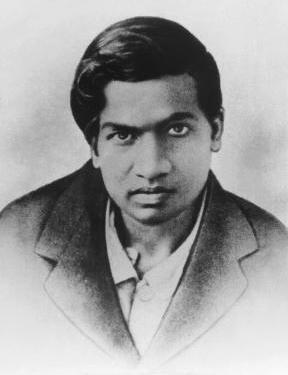
Srinivasa Ramanujan, working in isolation in India, produced many innovative series for computing π.

Modern π calculators do not use iterative algorithms exclusively. New infinite series were discovered in the 1980s and 1990s that are as fast as iterative algorithms, yet are simpler and less memory intensive. The fast iterative algorithms were anticipated in 1914, when Indian mathematician Srinivasa Ramanujan published dozens of innovative new formulae for π, remarkable for their elegance, mathematical depth and rapid convergence. One of his formulae, based on modular equations, is

$$\frac{1}{\pi} = \frac{2 \sqrt 2}{9801} \sum_{k=0}^\infty \frac{(4k)!(1103+26390k)}{k!^4 396^{4k}}.$$

This series converges much more rapidly than most arctan series, including Machin's formula. Bill Gosper was the first to use it for advances in the calculation of π, setting a record of 17 million digits in 1985. Ramanujan's formulae anticipated the modern algorithms developed by the Borwein brothers (Jonathan and Peter) and the Chudnovsky brothers. The Chudnovsky formula developed in 1987 is

$$\frac{1}{\pi} = \frac{\sqrt{10005}}{4270934400} \sum_{k=0}^\infty \frac{(6k)! (13591409 + 545140134k)}{(3k)!\,k!^3 (-640320)^{3k}}.$$

It produces about 14 digits of π per term and has been used for several record-setting π calculations, including the first to surpass 1 billion (10^{9}) digits in 1989 by the Chudnovsky brothers, 10 trillion (10^{13}) digits in 2011 by Alexander Yee and Shigeru Kondo, and 100 trillion digits by Emma Haruka Iwao in 2022. For similar formulae, see also the Ramanujan–Sato series.

In 2006, mathematician Simon Plouffe used the PSLQ integer relation algorithm to generate several new formulae for π, conforming to the following template:

$$\pi^k = \sum_{n=1}^\infty \frac{1}{n^k} \left(\frac{a}{q^n-1} + \frac{b}{q^{2n}-1} + \frac{c}{q^{4n}-1}\right),$$

where q is e^{π} (Gelfond's constant), k is an odd number, and a, b, c are certain rational numbers that Plouffe computed.

=== Monte Carlo methods ===
Buffon's needle. Needles a and b are dropped randomly.

Random dots are placed on a square and a circle inscribed inside.

Monte Carlo methods, which evaluate the results of multiple random trials, can be used to create approximations of π. Buffon's needle is one such technique: If a needle of length ℓ is dropped n times on a surface on which parallel lines are drawn t units apart, and if x of those times it comes to rest crossing a line (x > 0), then one may approximate π based on the counts:

$$\pi \approx \frac{2n\ell}{xt}.$$

Another Monte Carlo method for computing π is to draw a circle inscribed in a square, and randomly place dots in the square. The ratio of dots inside the circle to the total number of dots will approximately equal π/4.

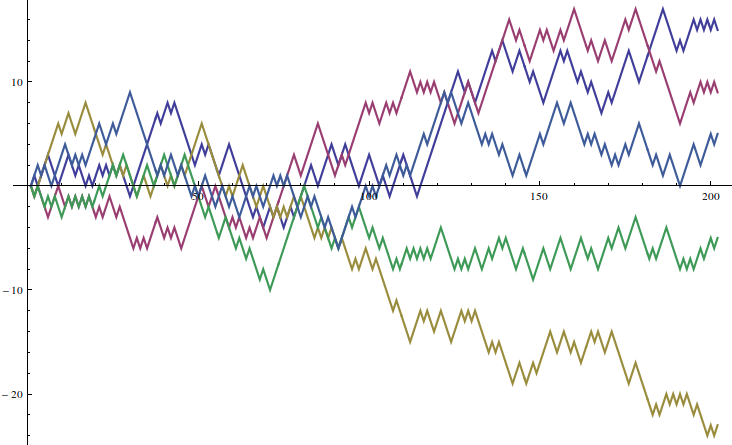
Five random walks with 200 steps. The sample mean of |W_{200}| is μ = 56/5, and so 2(200)μ^{−2} ≈ 3.19 is within 0.05 of π.

Another way to calculate π using probability is to start with a random walk, generated by a sequence of (fair) coin tosses: independent random variables X_{k} such that X_{k} ∈ {−1,1} with equal probabilities. The associated random walk is

$$W_n = \sum_{k=1}^n X_k$$

so that, for each n, W_{n} is drawn from a shifted and scaled binomial distribution. As n varies, W_{n} defines a (discrete) stochastic process. Then π can be calculated by

$$\pi = \lim_{n\to\infty} \frac{2n}{E[|W_n|]^2}.$$

This Monte Carlo method is independent of any relation to circles, and is a consequence of the central limit theorem, discussed below.

These Monte Carlo methods for approximating π are very slow compared to other methods, and do not provide any information on the exact number of digits obtained. Thus they are never used to approximate π when speed or accuracy is desired.

=== Spigot algorithms ===
Two algorithms were discovered in 1995 that opened up new avenues of research into π. They are called spigot algorithms because, like water dripping from a spigot, they produce single digits of π that are not reused after they are calculated. This is in contrast to infinite series or iterative algorithms, which retain and use all intermediate digits until the final result is produced.

Mathematicians Stan Wagon and Stanley Rabinowitz produced a simple spigot algorithm in 1995. Its speed is comparable to arctan algorithms, but not as fast as iterative algorithms.

Another spigot algorithm, the BBP digit extraction algorithm, was discovered in 1995 by Simon Plouffe:

$$\pi = \sum_{k=0}^\infty \frac{1}{16^k} \left( \frac{4}{8k + 1} - \frac{2}{8k + 4} - \frac{1}{8k + 5} - \frac{1}{8k + 6}\right).$$

This formula, unlike others before it, can produce any individual hexadecimal digit of π without calculating all the preceding digits. Individual binary digits may be extracted from individual hexadecimal digits, and octal digits can be extracted from one or two hexadecimal digits. An important application of digit extraction algorithms is to validate new claims of record π computations: After a new record is claimed, the decimal result is converted to hexadecimal, and then a digit extraction algorithm is used to calculate several randomly selected hexadecimal digits near the end; if they match, this provides a measure of confidence that the entire computation is correct.

Between 1998 and 2000, the distributed computing project PiHex used Bellard's formula (a modification of the BBP algorithm) to compute the quadrillionth (10^{15}th) bit of π, which turned out to be 0. In September 2010, a Yahoo employee used the company's Hadoop application on one thousand computers over a 23-day period to compute 256 bits of π at the two-quadrillionth (2×10^{15}th) bit, which also happens to be zero.

In 2022, Plouffe found a base-10 algorithm for calculating digits of π.

== Role and characterizations in mathematics ==
Because π is closely related to the circle, it is found in many formulae from the fields of geometry and trigonometry, particularly those concerning circles, spheres, or ellipses. Other branches of science, such as statistics, physics, Fourier analysis, and number theory, also include π in some of their important formulae.

=== Geometry and trigonometry ===
The area of the circle equals π times the shaded area $r^2$. The area of the unit circle is π.

π appears in formulae for areas and volumes of geometrical shapes based on circles, such as ellipses, spheres, cones, and tori. Below are some of the more common formulae that involve π.

- The circumference of a circle with radius r is 2πr.
- The area of a circle with radius r is πr^{2}.
- The area of an ellipse with semi-major axis a and semi-minor axis b is πab.
- The volume of a sphere with radius r is 4/3πr^{3}.
- The surface area of a sphere with radius r is 4πr^{2}.

Some of the formulae above are special cases of the volume of the n-dimensional ball and the surface area of its boundary, the (n−1)-dimensional sphere, given below.

Apart from circles, there are other curves of constant width. By Barbier's theorem, every curve of constant width has perimeter π times its width. The Reuleaux triangle (formed by the intersection of three circles with the sides of an equilateral triangle as their radii) has the smallest possible area for its width and the circle the largest. There also exist non-circular smooth and even algebraic curves of constant width.

Definite integrals that describe circumference, area, or volume of shapes generated by circles typically have values that involve π. For example, an integral that specifies half the area of a circle of radius one is given by:

$$\int_{-1}^1 \sqrt{1-x^2}\,dx = \frac{\pi}{2}.$$

In that integral, the function $\sqrt{1-x^2}$ represents the height over the $x$-axis of a semicircle (the square root is a consequence of the Pythagorean theorem), and the integral computes the area below the semicircle. The existence of such integrals makes π an algebraic period.

=== Unit of angle ===
Sine and cosine functions repeat with period 2π.

The trigonometric functions rely on angles, and mathematicians generally use the radian as a unit of measurement. π plays an important role in angles measured in radians, which are defined so that a complete circle spans an angle of 2π radians. The angle measure of 180° is equal to π radians, and 1° = π/180 radians.

Common trigonometric functions have periods that are multiples of π; for example, sine and cosine have period 2π, so for any angle θ and any integer k,
$$\sin\theta = \sin\left(\theta + 2\pi k \right) \text{ and } \cos\theta = \cos\left(\theta + 2\pi k \right).$$

=== Eigenvalues ===
The overtones of a vibrating string are eigenfunctions of the second derivative, and form a harmonic progression. The associated eigenvalues form the arithmetic progression of integer multiples of π.

Many of the appearances of π in the formulae of mathematics and the sciences have to do with its close relationship with geometry. However, π also appears in many natural situations having apparently nothing to do with geometry.

In many applications, it plays a distinguished role as an eigenvalue. For example, an idealized vibrating string can be modelled as the graph of a function f on the unit interval [0, 1], with fixed ends f(0) = f(1) = 0. The modes of vibration of the string are solutions of the differential equation $f' '(x) + \lambda f(x) = 0$, or $f' '(t) = -\lambda f(x)$. Thus λ is an eigenvalue of the second derivative operator $f \mapsto f' '$, and is constrained by Sturm–Liouville theory to take on only certain specific values. It must be positive, since the operator is negative definite, so it is convenient to write λ = ν^{2}, where ν > 0 is called the wavenumber. Then f(x) = sin(π x) satisfies the boundary conditions and the differential equation with ν = π.

The value π is, in fact, the least such value of the wavenumber, and is associated with the fundamental mode of vibration of the string. One way to show this is by estimating the energy, which satisfies Wirtinger's inequality: for a function $f : [0, 1] \to \Complex$ with f(0) = f(1) = 0 and f, f′ both square integrable, we have:

$$\pi^2\int_0^1|f(x)|^2\,dx\le \int_0^1|f'(x)|^2\,dx,$$

with equality precisely when f is a multiple of sin(π x). Here π appears as an optimal constant in Wirtinger's inequality, and it follows that it is the smallest wavenumber, using the variational characterization of the eigenvalue. As a consequence, π is the smallest singular value of the derivative operator on the space of functions on [0, 1] vanishing at both endpoints (the Sobolev space $H^1_0[0,1]$).

=== Inequalities ===
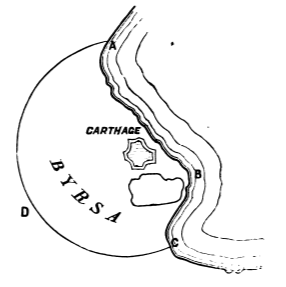
The ancient city of Carthage was the solution to an isoperimetric problem, according to a legend recounted by Lord Kelvin: those lands bordering the sea that Queen Dido could enclose on all other sides within a single given oxhide, cut into strips.

The number π appears in similar eigenvalue problems in higher-dimensional analysis. As mentioned above, it can be characterized via its role as the best constant in the isoperimetric inequality: the area A enclosed by a plane Jordan curve of perimeter P satisfies the inequality

$$4\pi A\le P^2,$$

and equality is clearly achieved for the circle, since in that case A = πr^{2} and P = 2πr.

Ultimately, as a consequence of the isoperimetric inequality, π appears in the optimal constant for the critical Sobolev inequality in n dimensions, which thus characterizes the role of π in many physical phenomena as well, for example those of classical potential theory. In two dimensions, the critical Sobolev inequality is

$$2\pi\|f\|_2 \le \|\nabla f\|_1$$

for f a smooth function with compact support in R^{2}, $\nabla f$ is the gradient of f, and $\|f\|_2$ and $\|\nabla f\|_1$ refer respectively to the L^{2} and L^{1}-norm. The Sobolev inequality is equivalent to the isoperimetric inequality (in any dimension), with the same best constants.

Wirtinger's inequality also generalizes to higher-dimensional Poincaré inequalities that provide best constants for the Dirichlet energy of an n-dimensional membrane. Specifically, π is the greatest constant such that

$$\pi \le \frac{\left (\int_G |\nabla u|^2\right)^{1/2}}{\left (\int_G|u|^2\right)^{1/2}}$$

for all convex subsets G of R^{n} of diameter 1, and square-integrable functions u on G of mean zero. Just as Wirtinger's inequality is the variational form of the Dirichlet eigenvalue problem in one dimension, the Poincaré inequality is the variational form of the Neumann eigenvalue problem, in any dimension.

=== Fourier transform and Heisenberg uncertainty principle ===
An animation of a geodesic in the Heisenberg group

The constant π also appears as a critical spectral parameter in the Fourier transform. This is the integral transform that takes a complex-valued integrable function f on the real line to the function defined as:

$$\hat{f}(\xi) = \int_{-\infty}^\infty f(x) e^{-2\pi i x\xi}\,dx.$$

Although there are several different conventions for the Fourier transform and its inverse, any such convention must involve π somewhere. The above is the most canonical definition, however, giving the unique unitary operator on L^{2} that is also an algebra homomorphism of L^{1} to L^{∞}.

The Heisenberg uncertainty principle also contains the number π. The uncertainty principle gives a sharp lower bound on the extent to which it is possible to localize a function both in space and in frequency: with our conventions for the Fourier transform,

$$\left(\int_{-\infty}^\infty x^2|f(x)|^2\,dx\right)
\left(\int_{-\infty}^\infty \xi^2|\hat{f}(\xi)|^2\,d\xi\right)
\ge
\left(\frac{1}{4\pi}\int_{-\infty}^\infty |f(x)|^2\,dx\right)^2.$$

The physical consequence, about the uncertainty in simultaneous position and momentum observations of a quantum mechanical system, is discussed below. The appearance of π in the formulae of Fourier analysis is ultimately a consequence of the Stone–von Neumann theorem, asserting the uniqueness of the Schrödinger representation of the Heisenberg group.

=== Gaussian integrals ===
A graph of the Gaussian function ƒ(x) = e^{−x^{2}}. The coloured region between the function and the x-axis has area √π.

The fields of probability and statistics frequently use the normal distribution as a simple model for complex phenomena; for example, scientists generally assume that the observational error in experiments follows a normal distribution. The Gaussian function, which is the probability density function of the normal distribution with mean μ and standard deviation σ, naturally contains π:

$$f(x) = {1 \over \sigma\sqrt{2\pi} }\,e^{-(x-\mu )^2/(2\sigma^2)}.$$

The factor of $\tfrac{1}{\sqrt{2\pi}}$ makes the area under the graph of f equal to one, as is required for a probability distribution. This follows from a change of variables in the Gaussian integral:

$$\int_{-\infty}^\infty e^{-u^2} \, du=\sqrt{\pi} ,$$

which says that the area under the basic bell curve in the figure is equal to the square root of π.

The central limit theorem explains the central role of normal distributions, and thus of π, in probability and statistics. This theorem is ultimately connected with the spectral characterization of π as the eigenvalue associated with the Heisenberg uncertainty principle, and the fact that equality holds in the uncertainty principle only for the Gaussian function. Equivalently, π is the unique constant making the Gaussian normal distribution e^{−πx^{2}} equal to its own Fourier transform. Indeed, according to Howe (1980), the "whole business" of establishing the fundamental theorems of Fourier analysis reduces to the Gaussian integral.

=== Topology ===
Uniformization of the Klein quartic, a surface of genus three and Euler characteristic −4, as a quotient of the hyperbolic plane by the symmetry group PSL(2,7) of the Fano plane. The hyperbolic area of a fundamental domain is 8π, by Gauss–Bonnet.

The constant π appears in the Gauss–Bonnet formula which relates the differential geometry of surfaces to their topology. Specifically, if a compact surface Σ has Gauss curvature K, then

$$\int_\Sigma K\,dA = 2\pi \chi(\Sigma),$$

where χ(Σ) is the Euler characteristic, which is an integer. An example is the surface area of a sphere S of curvature 1 (so that its radius of curvature, which coincides with its radius, is also 1.) The Euler characteristic of a sphere can be computed from its homology groups and is found to be equal to two. Thus we have

$$A(S) = \int_S 1\,dA = 2\pi\cdot 2 = 4\pi,$$

reproducing the formula for the surface area of a sphere of radius 1.

The constant appears in many other integral formulae in topology, in particular, those involving characteristic classes via the Chern–Weil homomorphism.

=== Cauchy's integral formula ===
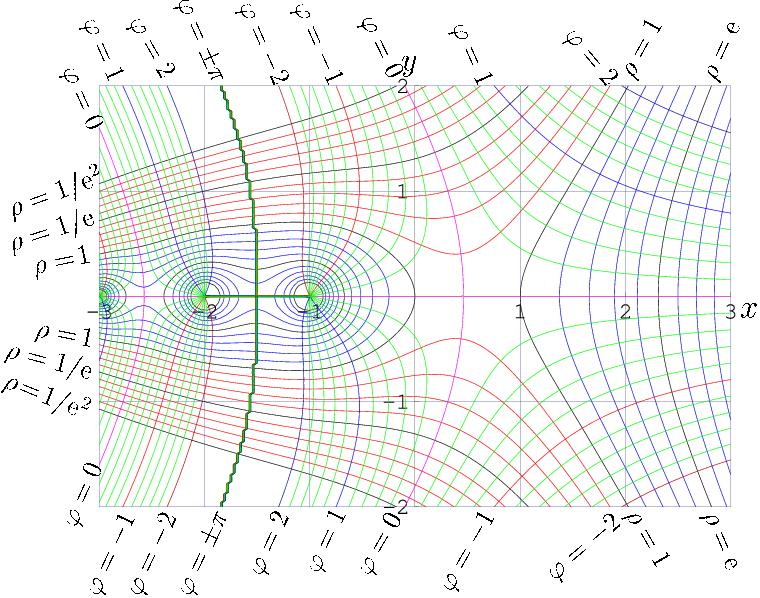
Complex analytic functions can be visualized as a collection of streamlines and equipotentials, systems of curves intersecting at right angles. Here illustrated is the complex logarithm of the gamma function.

One of the key tools in complex analysis is contour integration of a function over a positively oriented (rectifiable) Jordan curve γ. A form of Cauchy's integral formula states that if a point z_{0} is interior to γ, then

$$\oint_\gamma \frac{dz}{z-z_0} = 2\pi i.$$

Although the curve γ is not a circle, and hence does not have any obvious connection to the constant π, a standard proof of this result uses Morera's theorem, which implies that the integral is invariant under homotopy of the curve, so that it can be deformed to a circle and then integrated explicitly in polar coordinates. More generally, it is true that if a rectifiable closed curve γ does not contain z_{0}, then the above integral is 2πi times the winding number of the curve.

The general form of Cauchy's integral formula establishes the relationship between the values of a complex analytic function f(z) on the Jordan curve γ and the value of f(z) at any interior point z_{0} of γ:

$$\oint_\gamma { f(z) \over z-z_0 }\,dz = 2\pi i f (z_{0}),$$

provided f(z) is analytic in the region enclosed by γ and extends continuously to γ. Cauchy's integral formula is a special case of the residue theorem, that if g(z) is a meromorphic function on the region enclosed by γ and is continuous in a neighbourhood of γ, then

$$\oint_\gamma g(z)\, dz =2\pi i \sum \operatorname{Res}( g, a_k ),$$

where the sum is of the residues at the poles of g(z).

=== Vector calculus and physics ===
The constant π is ubiquitous in vector calculus and potential theory, for example in Coulomb's law, Gauss's law, Maxwell's equations, and even the Einstein field equations. Perhaps the simplest example of this is the two-dimensional Newtonian potential, representing the potential of a point source at the origin, whose associated field has unit outward flux through any smooth and oriented closed surface enclosing the source:

$$\Phi(\mathbf x) = \frac{1}{2\pi}\log|\mathbf x|.$$

The factor of $1/(2\pi)$ is necessary to ensure that $\Phi$ is the fundamental solution of the Poisson equation in $\mathbb R^2$:

$$\Delta\Phi = \delta,$$

where $\delta$ is the Dirac delta function.

In higher dimensions, factors of π are present because of a normalization by the n-dimensional volume of the unit n-sphere. For example, in three dimensions, the Newtonian potential is:

$$\Phi(\mathbf x) = -\frac{1}{4\pi|\mathbf x|},$$

which has the 2-dimensional volume (i.e., the area) of the unit 2-sphere in the denominator.

=== Total curvature ===
This curve has total curvature 6π and turning number 3; it has winding number 2 about p and an additional loop which does not contain p.

In the differential geometry of curves, the total curvature of a smooth plane curve is the amount it turns anticlockwise, in radians, from start to finish, computed as the integral of signed curvature with respect to arc length:

$$\int_a^b k(s)\,ds.$$

For a closed curve, this quantity is equal to 2πN for an integer N called the turning number or index of the curve. N is the winding number about the origin of the hodograph of the curve parametrized by arclength, a new curve lying on the unit circle, described by the normalized tangent vector at each point on the original curve. Equivalently, N is the degree of the map taking each point on the curve to the corresponding point on the hodograph, analogous to the Gauss map for surfaces.

=== Gamma function and Stirling's approximation ===
Plot of the gamma function on the real axis

The factorial function $n!$ is the product of all of the positive integers through n. The gamma function extends the concept of factorial (normally defined only for non-negative integers) to all complex numbers, except the negative real integers, with the identity $\Gamma(n)=(n-1)!$. When the gamma function is evaluated at half-integers, the result is naturally expressed in terms of π. For example, $\Gamma\bigl(\tfrac12\bigr) = \sqrt{\pi}$ and $\Gamma\bigl(\tfrac52\bigr) = \tfrac 34 \sqrt{\pi}$.

The gamma function is defined by its Weierstrass product development:

$$\Gamma(z) = \frac{e^{-\gamma z}}{z}\prod_{n=1}^\infty \frac{e^{z/n}}{1+z/n},$$

where γ is the Euler–Mascheroni constant. Evaluated at $z = \tfrac12$ and squared, the equation $\textstyle \gamma\bigl(\tfrac12\bigr)\vphantom)^2 = \pi$ reduces to the Wallis product formula. The gamma function is also connected to the Riemann zeta function and identities for the functional determinant, in which the constant π plays an important role.

The gamma function is used to calculate the volume V_{n}(r) of the n-dimensional ball of radius r in Euclidean n-dimensional space, and the surface area S_{n−1}(r) of its boundary, the (n−1)-dimensional sphere:

$$V_n(r) = \frac{\pi^{n/2}}{\Gamma\bigl(\frac{n}{2}+1\bigr)}r^n,$$

$$S_{n-1}(r) = \frac{n\pi^{n/2}}{\Gamma\bigl(\tfrac{n}{2}+1\bigr)}r^{n-1}.$$

Further, it follows from the functional equation that

$$2\pi r = \frac{S_{n+1}(r)}{V_n(r)}.$$

The gamma function can be used to create a simple approximation to the factorial function n! for large n: $n! \sim \sqrt{2 \pi n} \left(\frac{n}{e}\right)^n$, which is known as Stirling's approximation. Equivalently,

$$\pi = \lim_{n\to\infty} \frac{e^{2n}n!^2}{2 n^{2n+1}}.$$

As a geometrical application of Stirling's approximation, let Δ_{n} denote the standard simplex in n-dimensional Euclidean space, and (n + 1)Δ_{n} denote the simplex having all of its sides scaled up by a factor of n + 1. Then

$$\operatorname{Vol}((n+1)\Delta_n) = \frac{(n+1)^n}{n!} \sim \frac{e^{n+1}}{\sqrt{2\pi n}}.$$

Ehrhart's volume conjecture predicts that this is the (optimal) upper bound on the volume of a convex body containing only one integer lattice point.

=== Number theory and Riemann zeta function ===
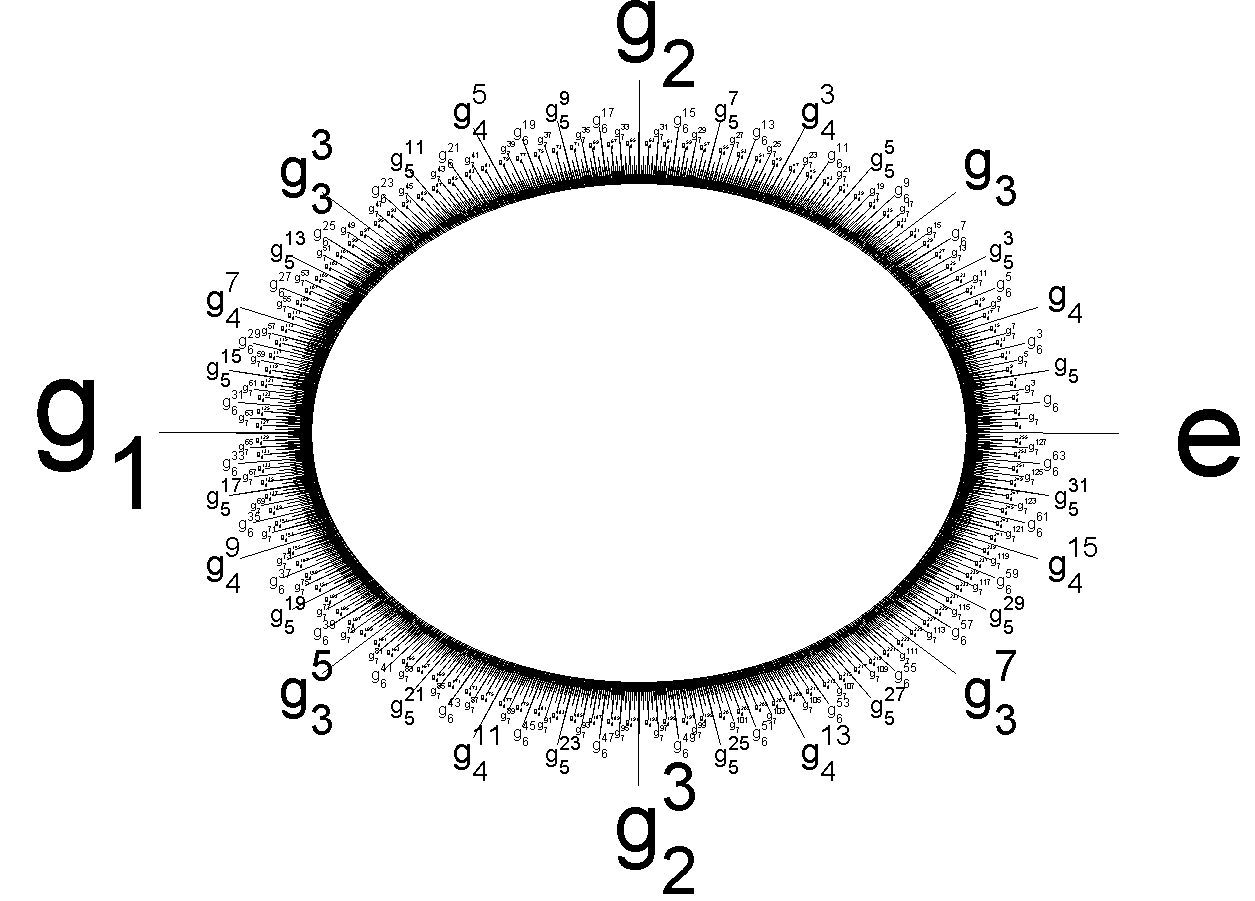
Each prime has an associated Prüfer group, which are arithmetic localizations of the circle. The L-functions of analytic number theory are also localized in each prime p.

Solution of the Basel problem using the Weil conjecture: the value of ζ(2) is the hyperbolic area of a fundamental domain of the modular group, times π/2.

The Riemann zeta function ζ(s) is used in many areas of mathematics. When evaluated at s = 2 it can be written as

$$\zeta(2) = \frac{1}{1^2} + \frac{1}{2^2} + \frac{1}{3^2} + \cdots.$$

Finding a simple solution for this infinite series was a famous problem in mathematics called the Basel problem. Leonhard Euler solved it in 1735 when he showed it was equal to π^{2}/6. Euler's result leads to the number-theoretic result that the probability of two random numbers being relatively prime (that is, having no shared factors) is equal to 6/π^{2}. This probability is based on the observation that the probability that any number is divisible by a prime p is 1/p (for example, every 7th integer is divisible by 7). Hence the probability that two numbers are both divisible by this prime is 1/p^{2}, and the probability that at least one of them is not is 1 − 1/p^{2}. For distinct primes, these divisibility events are mutually independent; so the probability that two numbers are relatively prime is given by a product over all primes:

$$\begin{align}
\prod_p^\infty \left(1-\frac{1}{p^2}\right) &= \left( \prod_p^\infty \frac{1}{1-p^{-2}} \right)^{-1}\\[4pt]
&= \frac{1}{1 + \frac{1}{2^2} + \frac{1}{3^2} + \cdots }\\[4pt]
&= \frac{1}{\zeta(2)} = \frac{6}{\pi^2} \approx 61\%.
\end{align}$$

This probability can be used in conjunction with a random number generator to approximate π using a Monte Carlo approach.

The solution to the Basel problem implies that the geometrically derived quantity π is connected in a deep way to the distribution of prime numbers. This is a special case of Weil's conjecture on Tamagawa numbers, which asserts the equality of similar such infinite products of arithmetic quantities, localized at each prime p, and a geometrical quantity: the reciprocal of the volume of a certain locally symmetric space. In the case of the Basel problem, it is the hyperbolic 3-manifold SL_{2}(R)/SL_{2}(Z).

The zeta function also satisfies Riemann's functional equation, which involves π as well as the gamma function:

$$\zeta(s) = 2^s\pi^{s-1}\ \sin\left(\frac{\pi s}{2}\right)\ \Gamma(1-s)\ \zeta(1-s).$$

Furthermore, the derivative of the zeta function satisfies

$$\exp(-\zeta'(0)) = \sqrt{2\pi}.$$

A consequence is that π can be obtained from the functional determinant of the harmonic oscillator. This functional determinant can be computed via a product expansion, and is equivalent to the Wallis product formula. The calculation can be recast in quantum mechanics, specifically the variational approach to the spectrum of the hydrogen atom.

=== Fourier series ===
π appears in characters of p-adic numbers (shown), which are elements of a Prüfer group. Tate's thesis makes heavy use of this machinery.

The constant π also appears naturally in Fourier series of periodic functions. Periodic functions are functions on the group T = R/Z of fractional parts of real numbers. The Fourier decomposition shows that a complex-valued function f on T can be written as an infinite linear superposition of unitary characters of T. That is, continuous group homomorphisms from T to the circle group U(1) of unit modulus complex numbers.

It is a theorem that every character of T is one of the complex exponentials $e_n(x)= e^{2\pi i n x}$. Among these, there is a unique character, up to complex conjugation, that is a group isomorphism from T onto the multiplicative group of complex numbers of absolute value one. A definition of the constant, due to Nicolas Bourbaki, takes π to be half the magnitude of the derivative of this isomorphism.

Equivalently, using the Haar measure on the circle group, the other characters have derivatives whose magnitudes are positive integral multiples of 2π. Thus π is the unique positive number such that the group T, equipped with its Haar measure, is Pontrjagin dual to the lattice of integral multiples of 2π. This is a version of the one-dimensional Poisson summation formula.

In Fourier analysis, the appearance of π rather than 2π often signals the passage from ordinary characters to projective representations. The basic exponential $e^{\pi i x}$ is not a character of the group T, since it changes sign after one turn of the circle; instead, it defines a representation of the double cover of T. This is the simplest example of a projective representation, and the same phenomenon recurs more broadly in harmonic analysis. Spinors, for example, represent rotations only after passing to a double cover, and metaplectic representations similarly arise from a double cover of SL(2,R). The same ideas also connect Fourier analysis with arithmetic, since theta functions and modular forms of half-integral weight are naturally governed by these metaplectic and Heisenberg-theoretic constructions.

=== Modular forms and theta functions ===
Theta functions transform under the lattice of periods of an elliptic curve.

The constant π is connected in a deep way with the theory of modular forms and theta functions. For example, the Chudnovsky algorithm involves in an essential way the j-invariant of an elliptic curve.

Modular forms are holomorphic functions in the upper half plane characterized by their transformation properties under the modular group $\mathrm{SL}_2(\mathbb Z)$ (or its various subgroups), a lattice in the group $\mathrm{SL}_2(\R)$. An example is the Jacobi theta function

$$\theta(z,\tau) = \sum_{n=-\infty}^\infty e^{2\pi i nz \ +\ \pi i n^2\tau},$$

which is a kind of modular form called a Jacobi form. This is sometimes written in terms of the nome $q=e^{\pi i \tau}$.

The constant π is the unique constant making the Jacobi theta function an automorphic form, meaning that it transforms in a specific way. Certain identities hold for all automorphic forms. An example is

$$\theta(z+\tau,\tau) = e^{-\pi i\tau -2\pi i z}\theta(z,\tau),$$

which implies that θ transforms as a representation under the discrete Heisenberg group. General modular forms and other theta functions also involve π, once again because of the Stone–von Neumann theorem.

=== Cauchy distribution and potential theory ===
The Witch of Agnesi, named for Maria Agnesi (1718–1799), is a geometrical construction of the graph of the Cauchy distribution.

The Cauchy distribution governs the passage of Brownian particles through a membrane.

The Cauchy distribution

$$g(x)=\frac{1}{\pi}\cdot\frac{1}{x^2+1}$$

is a probability density function. The total probability is equal to one, owing to the integral:

$$\int_{-\infty }^{\infty } \frac{1}{x^2+1} \, dx = \pi.$$

The Shannon entropy of the Cauchy distribution is equal to ln(4π), which also involves π.

The Cauchy distribution plays an important role in potential theory because it is the simplest Furstenberg measure, the classical Poisson kernel associated with a Brownian motion in a half-plane. Conjugate harmonic functions and hence the Hilbert transform are associated with the asymptotics of the Poisson kernel. The Hilbert transform H is the integral transform given by the Cauchy principal value of the singular integral

$$Hf(t) = \frac{1}{\pi}\int_{-\infty}^\infty \frac{f(x)\,dx}{x-t}.$$

The constant π is the unique (positive) normalizing factor such that H defines a linear complex structure on the Hilbert space of square-integrable real-valued functions on the real line. The Hilbert transform, like the Fourier transform, can be characterized purely in terms of its transformation properties on the Hilbert space L^{2}(R): up to a normalization factor, it is the unique bounded linear operator that commutes with positive dilations and anti-commutes with all reflections of the real line. The constant π is the unique normalizing factor that makes this transformation unitary.

=== In the Mandelbrot set ===
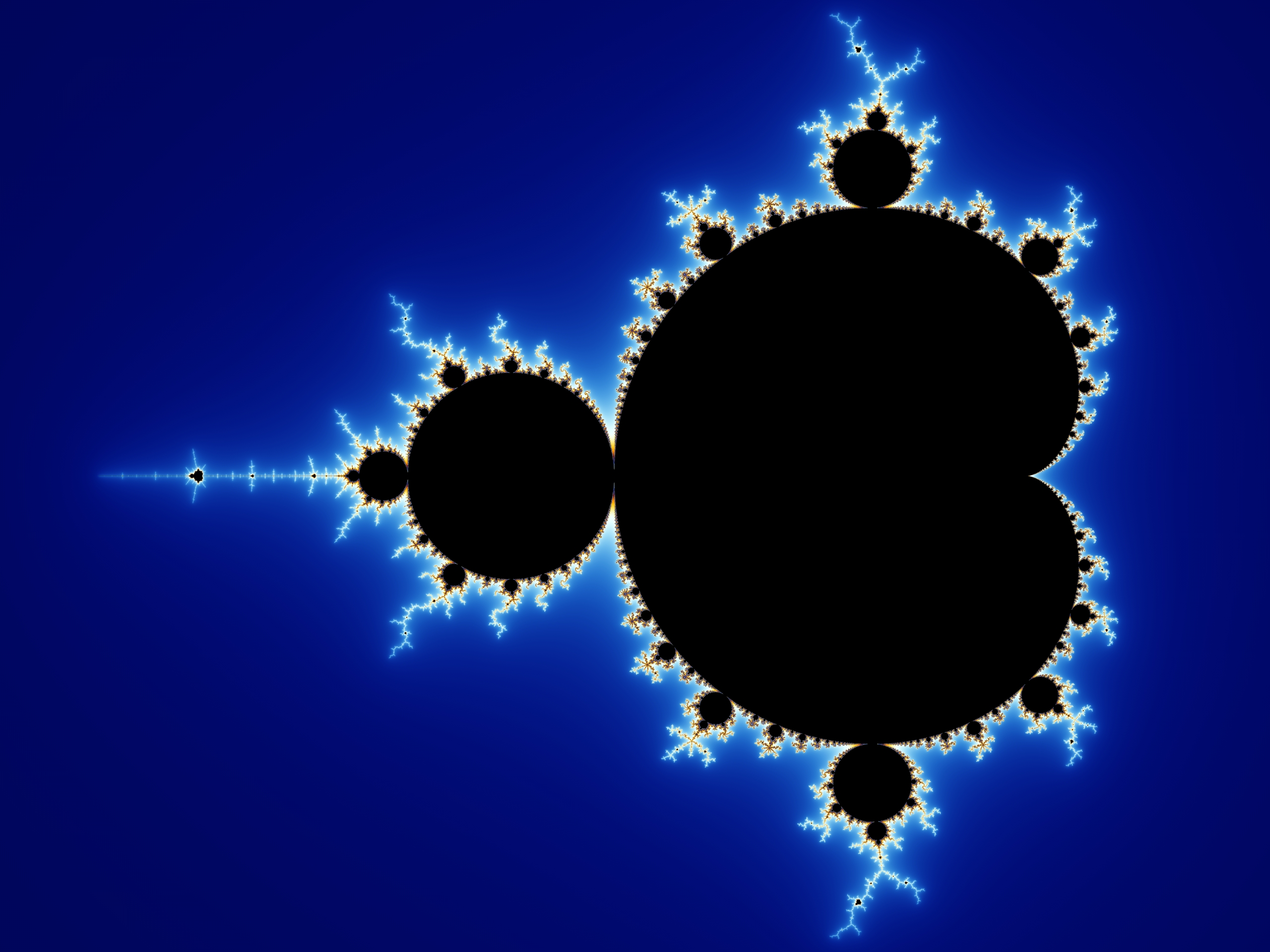
The Mandelbrot set can be used to approximate π.

An occurrence of π in the fractal called the Mandelbrot set was discovered by David Boll in 1991. He examined the behaviour of the Mandelbrot set near the "neck" at (−0.75, 0). When the number of iterations until divergence for the point (−0.75, ε) is multiplied by ε, the result approaches π as ε approaches zero. The point (0.25 + ε, 0) at the cusp of the large "valley" on the right side of the Mandelbrot set behaves similarly: the number of iterations until divergence multiplied by the square root of ε tends to π.

== Outside mathematics ==
=== Describing physical phenomena ===
Although not a physical constant, π appears routinely in equations describing physical phenomena, often because of π's relationship to the circle and to spherical coordinate systems. A simple formula from the field of classical mechanics gives the approximate period T of a simple pendulum of length L, swinging with a small amplitude (g is the earth's gravitational acceleration):

$$T \approx 2\pi \sqrt\frac{L}{g}.$$

One of the key formulae of quantum mechanics is Heisenberg's uncertainty principle, which shows that the uncertainty in the measurement of a particle's position (Δx) and momentum (Δp) cannot both be arbitrarily small at the same time (where h is the Planck constant):

$$\Delta x\, \Delta p \ge \frac{h}{4\pi}.$$

The fact that π is approximately equal to 3 plays a role in the relatively long lifetime of orthopositronium. The inverse lifetime to lowest order in the fine-structure constant α is

$$\frac{1}{\tau} = 2\frac{\pi^2 - 9}{9\pi}m_\text{e}\alpha^{6},$$

where m_{e} is the mass of the electron.

π is present in some structural engineering formulae, such as the buckling formula derived by Euler, which gives the maximum axial load F that a long, slender column of length L, modulus of elasticity E, and area moment of inertia I can carry without buckling:

$$F =\frac{\pi^2EI}{L^2}.$$

The field of fluid dynamics contains π in Stokes' law, which approximates the frictional force F exerted on small, spherical objects of radius R, moving with velocity v in a fluid with dynamic viscosity η:

$$F =6\pi\eta Rv.$$

In electromagnetics, the vacuum permeability constant μ_{0} appears in Maxwell's equations, which describe the properties of electric and magnetic fields and electromagnetic radiation. Before 20 May 2019, it was defined as exactly

$$\mu_0 = 4 \pi \times 10^{-7}\text{ H/m} \approx 1.2566370614 \ldots \times 10 ^{-6} \text{ N/A}^2.$$

=== Memorizing digits ===
Piphilology is the practice of memorizing large numbers of digits of π, and world records are kept by Guinness World Records. The record for memorizing digits of π, certified by Guinness World Records, is 70,000 digits, recited in India by Rajveer Meena in 9 hours and 27 minutes on 21 March 2015. In 2006, Akira Haraguchi, a retired Japanese engineer, claimed to have recited 100,000 decimal places, but the claim was not verified by Guinness World Records.

One common technique is to memorize a story or poem in which the word lengths represent the digits of π: The first word has three letters, the second word has one, the third has four, the fourth has one, the fifth has five, and so on. Such memorization aids are called mnemonics. An early example of a mnemonic for pi, originally devised by English scientist James Jeans, is "How I want a drink, alcoholic of course, after the heavy lectures involving quantum mechanics." When a poem is used, it is sometimes referred to as a piem. Poems for memorizing π have been composed in several languages in addition to English. Record-setting π memorizers typically do not rely on poems, but instead use methods such as remembering number patterns and the method of loci.

A few authors have used the digits of π to establish a new form of constrained writing, where the word lengths are required to represent the digits of π. The Cadaeic Cadenza contains the first 3,835 digits of π in this manner, and the full-length book Not a Wake contains 10,000 words, each representing one digit of π.

=== In popular culture ===
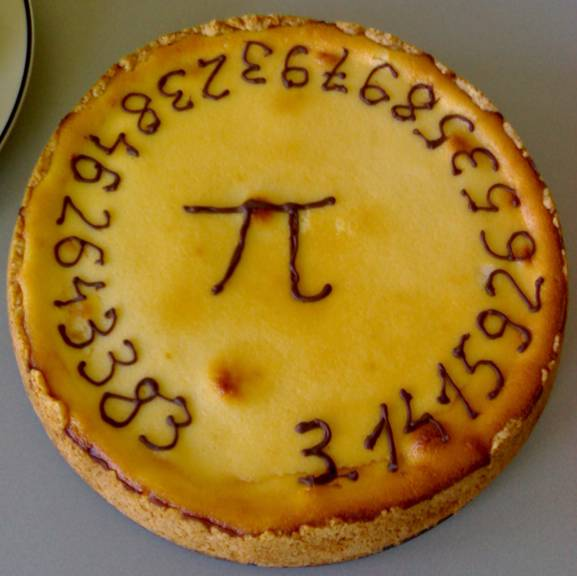
Baking and eating pie is a common way of celebrating Pi Day.

Perhaps because of the simplicity of its definition and its ubiquitous presence in formulae, π has been represented in popular culture more than other mathematical constructs.

In the Palais de la Découverte (a science museum in Paris) there is a circular room known as the pi room. On its wall are inscribed 707 digits of π. The digits are large wooden characters attached to the dome-like ceiling. The digits were based on an 1873 calculation by English mathematician William Shanks, which included an error beginning at the 528th digit. The error was detected in 1946 and corrected in 1949.

In Carl Sagan's 1985 novel Contact, it is suggested that the creator of the universe buried a message deep within the digits of π. This part of the story was omitted from the film adaptation of the novel. In the 1967 Star Trek episode "Wolf in the Fold", a computer possessed by a demonic entity is contained by being instructed to "Compute to the last digit the value of π".

In the United States, Pi Day falls on 14 March (written 3/14 in the US date format), and is popular among students. π and its digital representation are often used by self-described "math geeks" for inside jokes among mathematically and technologically minded groups. A college cheer variously attributed to the Massachusetts Institute of Technology or the Rensselaer Polytechnic Institute includes "3.14159". Pi Day in 2015 was particularly significant because the date and time 3/14/15 9:26:53 reflected many more digits of pi. In parts of the world where dates are commonly noted in day/month/year format, 22 July represents "Pi Approximation Day", as 22/7 ≈ 3.142857.

Some have proposed replacing π by τ = 2π, arguing that τ, as the number of radians in one turn or the ratio of a circle's circumference to its radius, is more natural than π and simplifies many formulae. This use of τ has not made its way into mainstream mathematics, but since 2010 this has led to people celebrating Two Pi Day or Tau Day on June 28.

In 1897, an amateur mathematician attempted to persuade the Indiana legislature to pass the Indiana Pi Bill, which described a method to square the circle and contained text that implied various incorrect values for π, including 3.2. The bill is notorious as an attempt to establish a value of a mathematical constant by legislative fiat. While the bill was passed by the Indiana House of Representatives, it was rejected by the Indiana Senate, and thus did not become a law.

== See also ==
- List of mathematical constants
- Chronology of computation of pi
