= Borwein integral =

Type of mathematical integrals

In mathematics, a Borwein integral is an integral whose unusual properties were first presented by mathematicians David Borwein and Jonathan Borwein in 2001. Borwein integrals involve products of $\operatorname{sinc}(ax)$, where the sinc function is given by $\operatorname{sinc}(x)=\sin(x)/x$ for $x$ not equal to 0, and $\operatorname{sinc}(0)=1$.

These integrals are remarkable for exhibiting apparent patterns that eventually break down. The following is an example.

$$\begin{align}
& \int_0^\infty \frac{\sin(x)}{x} \, dx= \frac \pi 2 \\[10pt]
& \int_0^\infty \frac{\sin(x)}{x}\frac{\sin(x/3)}{x/3} \, dx = \frac \pi 2 \\[10pt]
& \int_0^\infty \frac{\sin(x)}{x}\frac{\sin(x/3)}{x/3}\frac{\sin(x/5)}{x/5} \, dx = \frac \pi 2
\end{align}$$

This pattern continues up to

$$\int_0^\infty \frac{\sin(x)}{x}\frac{\sin(x/3)}{x/3}\cdots\frac{\sin(x/13)}{x/13} \, dx = \frac \pi 2.$$

At the next step the pattern fails,

$$\begin{align}
\int_0^\infty \frac{\sin(x)}{x}\frac{\sin(x/3)}{x/3}\cdots\frac{\sin(x/15)}{x/15} \, dx
&= \frac{467807924713440738696537864469}{935615849440640907310521750000}~\pi \\[5pt]
&\approx 0.499999999992646859~\pi \\[5pt]
&\approx \frac \pi 2 - 2.31\times 10^{-11}.
\end{align}$$

In general, similar integrals have value π/2 whenever the numbers 3, 5, 7… are replaced by positive real numbers such that the sum of their reciprocals is less than 1.

In the example above, 1/3 + 1/5 + … + 1/13 < 1, but 1/3 + 1/5 + … + 1/15 > 1.

With the inclusion of the additional factor $2\cos(x)$, the pattern holds up over a longer series,

$$\int_0^\infty 2 \cos(x) \frac{\sin(x)}{x}\frac{\sin(x/3)}{x/3}\cdots\frac{\sin(x/111)}{x/111} \, dx = \frac \pi 2,$$

but

$$\int_0^\infty 2 \cos(x) \frac{\sin(x)}{x}\frac{\sin(x/3)}{x/3}\cdots\frac{\sin(x/111)}{x/111}\frac{\sin(x/113)}{x/113} \, dx \approx \frac \pi 2 - 2.3324 \times 10^{-138}.$$

In this case, 1/3 + 1/5 + … + 1/111 < 2, but 1/3 + 1/5 + … + 1/113 > 2. The exact answer can be calculated using the general formula provided in the next section, and a representation of it is shown below. Fully expanded, this value turns into a fraction that involves two 2736 digit integers.

$$\frac{\pi}{2}\left(1-\frac{3\cdot 5\cdots 113\cdot(1/3+1/5+\dots+1/113-2)^{56}}{2^{55}\cdot 56!}\right)$$

The reason the original and the extended series break down has been demonstrated with an intuitive mathematical explanation. In particular, a random walk reformulation with a causality argument sheds light on the pattern breaking and opens the way for a number of generalizations.

== General formula ==
Given a sequence of nonzero real numbers, $a_0, a_1, a_2,\ldots$, a general formula for the integral

$$\int_0^\infty \prod_{k=0}^n \frac{\sin(a_kx)}{a_kx} \, dx$$

can be given. To state the formula, one will need to consider sums involving the $a_k$. In particular, if $\gamma = (\gamma_1,\gamma_2,\ldots,\gamma_n)\in\{\pm 1\}^n$ is an $n$-tuple where each entry is $\pm 1$, then we write $b_{\gamma}=a_0+\gamma_1a_1+\gamma_2a_2+\cdots+\gamma_na_n$, which is a kind of alternating sum of the first few $a_k$, and we set $\varepsilon_\gamma=\gamma_1\gamma_2\cdots\gamma_n$, which is either $\pm 1$. With this notation, the value for the above integral is

$$\int_0^\infty \prod_{k=0}^n \frac{\sin(a_kx)}{a_kx} \, dx = \frac{\pi}{2a_0} C_n$$

where

$$C_n = \frac 1 {2^nn!\prod_{k=1}^na_k} \sum_{\gamma\in\{\pm 1\}^n} \varepsilon_\gamma b_\gamma^n \sgn(b_\gamma)$$

In the case when $a_0 > |a_1|+|a_2|+\cdots+|a_n|$, we have $C_n=1$.

Furthermore, if there is an $n$ such that for each $k=0,\ldots,n-1$ we have $0<a_n < 2a_k$ and $a_1+a_2+\cdots+a_{n-1} < a_0 < a_1+a_2+\cdots+a_{n-1}+a_n$, which means that $n$ is the first value when the partial sum of the first $n$ elements of the sequence exceed $a_0$, then $C_k=1$ for each $k=0,\ldots,n-1$ but

$$C_n = 1 - \frac{(a_1+a_2+\cdots+a_n-a_0)^n}{2^{n-1}n! \prod_{k=1}^na_k}$$

The first example is the case when $a_k=\frac{1}{2k+1}$.

Note that if $n=7$ then $a_7=\frac{1}{15}$ and $\frac{1}{3}+\frac{1}{5}+\frac{1}{7}+\frac{1}{9}+\frac{1}{11}+\frac{1}{13}\approx 0.955$ but $\frac{1}{3}+\frac{1}{5}+\frac{1}{7}+\frac{1}{9}+\frac{1}{11}+\frac{1}{13}+\frac{1}{15}\approx 1.02$, so because $a_0=1$, we get that

$$\int_0^\infty \frac{\sin(x)} x \frac{\sin(x/3)}{x/3}\cdots\frac{\sin(x/13)}{x/13} \, dx = \frac \pi 2$$

which remains true if we remove any of the products, but that

$$\begin{align}
& \int_0^\infty \frac{\sin(x)} x \frac{\sin(x/3)}{x/3}\cdots\frac{\sin(x/15)}{x/15} \, dx \\[5pt]
= {} & \frac{\pi}{2}\left(1-\frac{(3^{-1} + 5^{-1} + 7^{-1} + 9^{-1} + 11^{-1} + 13^{-1} + 15^{-1}-1)^7}{2^6\cdot 7! \cdot (1/3 \cdot 1/5 \cdot 1/7 \cdot 1/9 \cdot 1/11 \cdot 1/13 \cdot 1/15)}\right),
\end{align}$$

which is equal to the value given previously.

== Method to solve Borwein integrals ==
An exact integration method that is efficient for evaluating Borwein-like integrals is discussed here. This integration method works by reformulating integration in terms of a series of differentiations and it yields intuition into the unusual behavior of the Borwein integrals. The Integration by Differentiation method is applicable to general integrals, including Fourier and Laplace transforms. It is used in the integration engine of Maple since 2019. The Integration by Differentiation method is independent of the Feynman method that also uses differentiation to integrate.

== Infinite products ==
While the integral

$$\begin{align}
\int_0^\infty \prod_{k = 0}^n \frac{\sin(x/(2k+1))}{x/(2k+1)} \, dx
\end{align}$$

becomes less than $\frac{\pi}{2}$ when $n$ exceeds 6, it never becomes much less, and in fact Borwein and Bailey have shown

$$\begin{align}
\int_0^\infty \prod_{k = 0}^\infty \frac{\sin(x/(2k+1))}{x/(2k+1)}  \, dx &=
\int_0^\infty \lim_{n \to \infty}  \prod_{k = 0}^n \frac{\sin(x/(2k+1))}{x/(2k+1)}  \, dx \\[5pt]
&= \lim_{n \to \infty} \int_0^\infty  \prod_{k = 0}^n \frac{\sin(x/(2k+1))}{x/(2k+1)}  \, dx \\[5pt]
&\approx \frac{\pi}{2} - 0.0000352
\end{align}$$

where we can pull the limit out of the integral thanks to the dominated convergence theorem. Similarly, while

$$\int_0^\infty 2 \cos x \prod_{k = 0}^n \frac{\sin(x/(2k+1))}{x/(2k+1)} \, dx$$

becomes less than $\frac{\pi}{2}$ when $n$ exceeds 55, we have

$$\int_0^\infty 2 \cos x \prod_{k = 0}^n\frac{\sin(x/(2k+1))}{x/(2k+1)} \, dx \approx \frac{\pi}{2} - 2.9629 \cdot 10^{-42}$$

Furthermore, using the Weierstrass factorizations

$$\frac{\sin x}{x} = \prod_{n = 1}^\infty \left( 1  - \frac{x^2}{\pi^2 n^2} \right)  \qquad  \cos x = \prod_{n = 0}^\infty \left( 1  - \frac{4x^2}{\pi^2 (2n+1)^2} \right)$$

one can show

$$\prod_{n = 0}^\infty \frac{\sin (2x/(2n+1))}{2x/(2n+1)} =
\prod_{n = 1}^\infty \cos\left(\frac{x}{n}\right)$$

and with a change of variables obtain

$$\int_0^\infty \prod_{n=1}^\infty \cos\left(\frac{x}{n} \right) \, d  x   = \frac{1}{2} \int_0^\infty \prod_{n = 0}^\infty \frac{\sin (x/(2n+1))}{x/(2n+1)} \,d x  \approx \frac{\pi}{4} - 0.0000176$$

and

$$\int_0^\infty \cos(2x) \prod_{n=1}^\infty \cos\left(\frac{x}{n} \right) \, d  x  = \frac{1}{2}
\int_0^\infty \cos(x) \prod_{n = 0}^\infty \frac{\sin (x/(2n+1))}{x/(2n+1)} \,d x  \approx \frac{\pi}{8} - 7.4073 \cdot 10^{-43}$$

== Probabilistic formulation ==
Schmuland has given appealing probabilistic formulations of the infinite product Borwein integrals. For example, consider the random harmonic series

$$\pm 1 \pm \frac{1}{2} \pm \frac{1}{3} \pm \frac{1}{4} \pm \frac{1}{5} \pm \cdots$$

where one flips independent fair coins to choose the signs. This series converges almost surely, that is, with probability 1. The probability density function of the result is a well-defined function, and the value of this function at 2 is close to 1/8. However, it is closer to

$$0.124999999999999999999999999999999999999999764 \ldots$$

Schmuland's explanation is that this quantity is $1/\pi$ times

$$\int_0^\infty \cos(2x) \prod_{n=1}^\infty \cos\left(\frac{x}{n} \right) \, d  x \approx \frac{\pi}{8} - 7.4073 \cdot 10^{-43}$$
