= Simon Plouffe =

Canadian mathematician

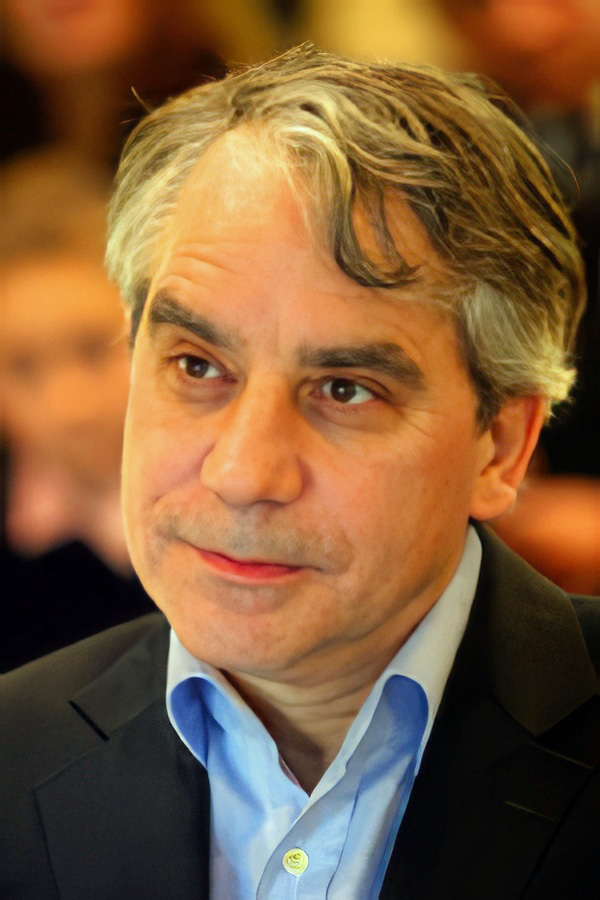
Simon Plouffe

Simon Plouffe (born June 11, 1956) is a Canadian mathematician who discovered the Bailey–Borwein–Plouffe formula (BBP algorithm) which permits the computation of the nth binary digit of π, in 1995. His other 2022 formula allows extracting the nth digit of π in decimal. He was born in Saint-Jovite, Quebec.

He co-authored The Encyclopedia of Integer Sequences, made into the website On-Line Encyclopedia of Integer Sequences dedicated to integer sequences later in 1995. In 1975, Plouffe broke the world record for memorizing digits of π by reciting 4096 digits, a record which stood until 1977.

== See also ==
- Fabrice Bellard, who discovered in 1997 a faster formula to compute pi.
- PiHex
