= List of topics related to π =

This is a list of topics related to pi (π), the fundamental mathematical constant.

- 2π theorem
- Approximations of π
- Arithmetic–geometric mean
- Bailey–Borwein–Plouffe formula
- Basel problem
- Borwein's algorithm
- Buffon's needle
- Cadaeic Cadenza
- Chronology of computation of π
- Circle
- Euler's identity
- Six nines in pi
- Gauss–Legendre algorithm
- Gaussian function
- History of π
- A History of Pi
- Indiana Pi Bill
- Leibniz formula for pi
- Lindemann–Weierstrass theorem (Proof that π is transcendental)
- List of circle topics
- List of formulae involving π
- Liu Hui's π algorithm
- Mathematical constant (sorted by continued fraction representation)
- Mathematical constants and functions
- Method of exhaustion
- Milü
- Pi
- Pi (art project)
- Pi (letter)
- Pi Day
- PiFast
- PiHex
- Pi in the Sky
- Pilish
- Pimania
- Piphilology
- Proof that π is irrational
- Proof that 22/7 exceeds π
- Proof of Wallis product
- Rabbi Nehemiah
- Radian
- Ramanujan–Sato series
- Rhind Mathematical Papyrus
- Salamin–Brent algorithm
- Software for calculating π
- Squaring the circle
- Turn (geometry)
- Viète's formula
