= List of formulae involving π =

Uses of the constant

The following is a list of significant formulae involving the mathematical constant π. Many of these formulae can be found in the article Pi, or the article Approximations of π.

== Euclidean geometry ==
$$\pi = \frac Cd = \frac C{2r}$$

where C is the circumference of a circle, d is the diameter, and r is the radius. More generally,

$$\pi=\frac{L}{w}$$

where L and w are, respectively, the perimeter and the width of any curve of constant width.

$$A = \pi r^2$$

where A is the area of a circle. More generally,

$$A = \pi ab$$

where A is the area enclosed by an ellipse with semi-major axis a and semi-minor axis b.

$$C=\frac{2\pi}{\operatorname{agm}(a,b)}\left(a_1^2-\sum_{n=2}^\infty 2^{n-1}(a_n^2-b_n^2)\right)$$

where C is the circumference of an ellipse with semi-major axis a and semi-minor axis b and $a_n,b_n$ are the arithmetic and geometric iterations of $\operatorname{agm}(a,b)$, the arithmetic-geometric mean of a and b with the initial values $a_0=a$ and $b_0=b$.

$$A=4\pi r^2$$

where A is the area between the witch of Agnesi and its asymptotic line; r is the radius of the defining circle.

$$A=\frac{\Gamma (1/4)^2}{2\sqrt{\pi}} r^2=\frac{\pi r^2}{\operatorname{agm}(1,1/\sqrt{2})}$$

where A is the area of a squircle with minor radius r, $\Gamma$ is the gamma function.

$$A=(k+1)(k+2)\pi r^2$$

where A is the area of an epicycloid with the smaller circle of radius r and the larger circle of radius kr ($k\in\mathbb{N}$), assuming the initial point lies on the larger circle.

$$A=\frac{(-1)^k+3}{8}\pi a^2$$

where A is the area of a rose with angular frequency k ($k\in\mathbb{N}$) and amplitude a.

$$L=\frac{\Gamma (1/4)^2}{\sqrt{\pi}}c=\frac{2\pi c}{\operatorname{agm}(1,1/\sqrt{2})}$$

where L is the perimeter of the lemniscate of Bernoulli with focal distance c.

$$V = {4 \over 3}\pi r^3$$

where V is the volume of a sphere and r is the radius.

$$SA = 4\pi r^2$$

where SA is the surface area of a sphere and r is the radius.

$$HV = {1 \over 2}\pi^2 r^4$$

where HV is the hypervolume of a 3-sphere and r is the radius.

$$SV = 2\pi^2 r^3$$

where SV is the surface volume of a 3-sphere and r is the radius.

=== Regular convex polygons ===
Sum S of internal angles of a regular convex polygon with n sides:

$$S=(n-2)\pi$$

Area A of a regular convex polygon with n sides and side length s:

$$A=\frac{ns^2}{4}\cot\frac{\pi}{n}$$

Inradius r of a regular convex polygon with n sides and side length s:

$$r=\frac{s}{2}\cot\frac{\pi}{n}$$

Circumradius R of a regular convex polygon with n sides and side length s:

$$R=\frac{s}{2}\csc\frac{\pi}{n}$$

== Physics ==
- The cosmological constant:
  $$\Lambda = {{8\pi G} \over {3c^2}} \rho$$
- Heisenberg's uncertainty principle:
  $$\Delta x\, \Delta p \ge \frac h {4\pi}$$
- Einstein's field equation of general relativity:
  $$R_{\mu\nu} - \frac{1}{2}g_{\mu\nu}R + \Lambda g_{\mu\nu} = {8 \pi G \over c^4} T_{\mu\nu}$$
- Coulomb's law for the electric force in vacuum:
  $$F = \frac{|q_1q_2|}{4 \pi \varepsilon_0 r^2}$$
- Magnetic permeability of free space: (Note: The relation $\mu_0 = 4 \pi \cdot 10^{-7}\,\mathrm{N}/\mathrm{A}^2$ was valid until the 2019 revision of the SI.)
  $$\mu_0 \approx 4 \pi \cdot 10^{-7}\,\mathrm{N}/\mathrm{A}^2$$
- Approximate period of a simple pendulum with small amplitude:
  $$T \approx 2\pi \sqrt\frac L g$$
- Exact period of a simple pendulum with amplitude $\theta_0$ ($\operatorname{agm}$ is the arithmetic–geometric mean):
  $$T=\frac{2\pi}{\operatorname{agm}(1,\cos (\theta_0/2))}\sqrt{\frac{L}{g}}$$
- Period of a spring-mass system with spring constant $k$ and mass $m$:
  $$T = 2\pi \sqrt{\frac{m}{k}}$$
- Kepler's third law of planetary motion:
  $$\frac{R^3}{T^2} = \frac{GM}{4\pi^2}$$
- The buckling formula:
  $$F =\frac{\pi^2EI}{L^2}$$

A puzzle involving "colliding billiard balls":

$$\lfloor{b^N\pi}\rfloor$$

is the number of collisions made (in ideal conditions, perfectly elastic with no friction) by an object of mass m initially at rest between a fixed wall and another object of mass b^{2N}m, when struck by the other object. (This gives the digits of π in base b up to N digits past the radix point.)

== Formulae yielding π ==
=== Integrals ===
$2 \int_{-1}^1 \sqrt{1-x^2}\,dx = \pi$ (integrating two halves $y(x)=\sqrt{1-x^2}$ to obtain the area of the unit circle)

$\int_{0}^2 \sqrt{4-x^2}\,dx = \pi$ (integrating a quarter of a circle with a radius of two $x^2+y^2=4$ to obtain ${4 \pi}/4$)

$$\int_{-\infty}^\infty \operatorname{sech}x \, dx = \pi$$

$$\int_{-\infty}^\infty \int_t^\infty e^{-1/2t^2-x^2+xt} \, dx \, dt = \int_{-\infty}^\infty \int_t^\infty e^{-t^2-1/2x^2+xt} \, dx \, dt = \pi$$

$$\int_{-1}^1\frac{dx}{\sqrt{1-x^2}} = \pi$$

$\int_{-\infty}^\infty\frac{dx}{1+x^2} = \pi$ (Note: (integral form of arctan over its entire domain, giving the period of tan)) (see also Cauchy distribution)

$\int_{-\infty}^\infty \frac{\sin x}{x} \,dx = \pi$ (see Dirichlet integral)

$\int_{-\infty}^\infty e^{-x^2}\,dx = \sqrt{\pi}$ (see Gaussian integral).

$\oint\frac{dz} z = 2\pi i$ (when the path of integration winds once counterclockwise around 0. See also Cauchy's integral formula).

$\int_0^\infty \ln\left(1+\frac{1}{x^2}\right)\, dx=\pi$

$\int_0^1 {x^4(1-x)^4 \over 1+x^2}\,dx = {22 \over 7} - \pi$ (see also Proof that 22/7 exceeds π).

$$\int_0^1 {x^2(1+x)^4 \over 1+x^2}\,dx = \pi- {17 \over 15}$$

$$\int_0^\infty \frac{x^{\alpha-1}}{x+1}\, dx=\frac{\pi}{\sin \pi\alpha},\quad 0<\alpha<1$$

$\int_0^\infty \frac{dx}{\sqrt{x(x+a)(x+b)}}=\frac{\pi}{\operatorname{agm}(\sqrt{a},\sqrt{b})}$ (where $\operatorname{agm}$ is the arithmetic–geometric mean; see also elliptic integral)

Note that with symmetric integrands $f(-x)=f(x)$, formulas of the form $\int_{-a}^af(x)\,dx$ can also be translated to formulas $2\int_{0}^af(x)\,dx$.

=== Efficient infinite series ===
$\sum_{k=0}^\infty \frac{k!}{(2k+1)!!} = \sum_{k=0}^\infty\frac{2^k k!^2}{(2k+1)!} = \frac \pi 2$ (see also Double factorial)

$$\sum_{k=0}^\infty \frac{k!}{2^k(2k+1)!!}=\frac{2\pi}{3\sqrt{3}}$$

$$\sum_{k=0}^\infty \frac{k!\,(2k)!\,(25k-3)}{(3k)!\,2^{k}}=\frac{\pi}{2}$$

$\sum^\infty_{k=0} \frac{(-1)^k (6k)! (13591409 + 545140134k)}{(3k)!(k!)^3 640320^{3k}}=\frac{4270934400}{\sqrt{10005}\pi}$ (see Chudnovsky algorithm)

$\sum^\infty_{k=0} \frac{(4k)!(1103+26390k)}{(k!)^4 396^{4k}}=\frac{9801}{2\sqrt{2}\pi}$ (see Srinivasa Ramanujan, Ramanujan–Sato series)

The following are efficient for calculating arbitrary binary digits of π:

$\sum_{k=0}^\infty \frac{(-1)^k}{4^k}\left(\frac{2}{4k+1}+\frac{2}{4k+2}+\frac{1}{4k+3}\right)=\pi$

$\sum_{k = 0}^{\infty} \frac{1}{16^k} \left( \frac{4}{8k + 1} - \frac{2}{8k + 4} - \frac{1}{8k + 5} - \frac{1}{8k + 6}\right)=\pi$ (see Bailey–Borwein–Plouffe formula)

$$\sum_{k=0}^\infty \frac{1}{16^k}\left(\frac{8}{8k+2}+\frac{4}{8k+3}+\frac{4}{8k+4}-\frac{1}{8k+7}\right)=2\pi$$

$$\sum_{k=0}^{\infty} \frac{{(-1)}^k}{2^{10k}} \left( - \frac{2^5}{4k+1} - \frac{1}{4k+3} + \frac{2^8}{10k+1} - \frac{2^6}{10k+3} - \frac{2^2}{10k+5} - \frac{2^2}{10k+7} + \frac{1}{10k+9} \right)=2^6\pi$$

Plouffe's series for calculating arbitrary decimal digits of π:

$$\sum_{k=1}^\infty k\frac{2^kk!^2}{(2k)!}=\pi +3$$

=== Other infinite series ===
$\zeta(2) = \frac{1}{1^2} + \frac{1}{2^2} + \frac{1}{3^2} + \frac{1}{4^2} + \cdots = \frac{\pi^2}{6}$ (see also Basel problem and Riemann zeta function)

$$\zeta(4)= \frac{1}{1^4} + \frac{1}{2^4} + \frac{1}{3^4} + \frac{1}{4^4} + \cdots = \frac{\pi^4}{90}$$

$\zeta(2n) = \sum_{k=1}^{\infty} \frac{1}{k^{2n}}\, = \frac{1}{1^{2n}} + \frac{1}{2^{2n}} + \frac{1}{3^{2n}} + \frac{1}{4^{2n}} + \cdots = (-1)^{n+1}\frac{B_{2n}(2\pi)^{2n}}{2(2n)!}$ , where B_{2n} is a Bernoulli number.

$\sum_{n=1}^\infty \frac{3^n - 1}{4^n}\, \zeta(n+1) = \pi$

$$\sum_{n=1}^\infty \frac{7^n - 1}{8^n}\, \zeta(n+1) = (1+\sqrt{2})\pi$$

$$\sum_{n=2}^\infty \frac{2(3/2)^n-3}{n}(\zeta (n)-1)=\ln \pi$$

$$\sum_{n=1}^\infty \zeta (2n)\frac{x^{2n}}{n}=\ln\frac{\pi x}{\sin \pi x},\quad 0<|x|<1$$

$\sum_{n=0}^\infty \frac{(-1)^{n}}{2n+1} = 1 - \frac{1}{3} + \frac{1}{5} - \frac{1}{7} + \frac{1}{9} - \cdots = \arctan{1} = \frac{\pi}{4}$ (see Leibniz formula for pi)

$$\sum_{n=0}^\infty \left(\frac{1}{3n+1}-\frac{1}{3n+2}\right) = 1 - \frac{1}{2} + \frac{1}{4} - \frac{1}{5} + \cdots = \frac{\pi}{3\sqrt 3}$$

$\sum_{n=0}^\infty \frac{(-1)^{(n^2-n)/2}}{2n+1}=1+\frac13-\frac15-\frac17+\frac19+\frac{1}{11}-\cdots=\frac{\pi}{2\sqrt{2}}$ (Newton, Second Letter to Oldenburg, 1676)

$\sum_{n=0}^\infty \frac{(-1)^n}{3^n(2n+1)}=1-\frac{1}{3^1\cdot 3}+\frac{1}{3^2\cdot 5}-\frac{1}{3^3\cdot 7}+\frac{1}{3^4\cdot 9}-\cdots =\sqrt{3}\arctan\frac{1}{\sqrt{3}}=\frac{\pi}{2\sqrt{3}}$ (Madhava series)

$$\sum_{n=1}^\infty \frac{(-1)^{n+1}}{n^2}=\frac{1}{1^2} - \frac{1}{2^2} + \frac{1}{3^2} - \frac{1}{4^2} + \cdots=\frac{\pi^2}{12}$$

$$\sum_{n=1}^\infty \frac1{(2n)^2} = \frac{1}{2^2} + \frac{1}{4^2} + \frac{1}{6^2} + \frac{1}{8^2} + \cdots = \frac{\pi^2}{24}$$

$$\sum_{n=0}^\infty \left( \frac{1}{2n+1} \right)^2 = \frac{1}{1^2} + \frac{1}{3^2} + \frac{1}{5^2} + \frac{1}{7^2} + \cdots = \frac{\pi^2}{8}$$

$$\sum_{n=0}^\infty \left( \frac{(-1)^{n}}{2n+1} \right)^3 = \frac{1}{1^3} - \frac{1}{3^3} + \frac{1}{5^3} - \frac{1}{7^3} + \cdots = \frac{\pi^3}{32}$$

$$\sum_{n=0}^\infty \left( \frac{1}{2n+1} \right)^4 = \frac{1}{1^4} + \frac{1}{3^4} + \frac{1}{5^4} + \frac{1}{7^4} + \cdots = \frac{\pi^4}{96}$$

$$\sum_{n=0}^\infty \left( \frac{(-1)^{n}}{2n+1} \right)^5 = \frac{1}{1^5} - \frac{1}{3^5} + \frac{1}{5^5} - \frac{1}{7^5} + \cdots = \frac{5\pi^5}{1536}$$

$$\sum_{n=0}^\infty \left( \frac{1}{2n+1} \right)^6 = \frac{1}{1^6} + \frac{1}{3^6} + \frac{1}{5^6} + \frac{1}{7^6} + \cdots = \frac{\pi^6}{960}$$

In general,

$$\sum_{n=0}^\infty \frac{(-1)^n}{(2n+1)^{2k+1}}=(-1)^{k}\frac{E_{2k}}{2(2k)!}\left(\frac{\pi}{2}\right)^{2k+1},\quad k\in\mathbb{N}_0$$

where $E_{2k}$ is the $2k$th Euler number.

$$\sum_{n=0}^\infty  \binom{\frac{1}{2}}{n}\frac{(-1)^n}{2n+1} = 1 - \frac{1}{6} - \frac{1}{40}-\cdots = \frac{\pi}{4}$$

$$\sum_{n=0}^\infty \frac{1}{(4n+1)(4n+3)} = \frac{1}{1\cdot 3}+\frac{1}{5\cdot 7} +\frac{1}{9\cdot 11} +\cdots=\frac{\pi}{8}$$

$\sum_{n=1}^\infty (-1)^{(n^2+n)/2+1}\left|G_{\left((-1)^{n+1}+6n-3\right)/4}\right|=|G_1|+|G_2|-|G_4|-|G_5|+|G_7|+|G_8|-|G_{10}|-|G_{11}|+\cdots =\frac{\sqrt{3}}{\pi}$ (see Gregory coefficients)

$\sum_{n=0}^\infty \frac{(1/2)_n^2}{2^n n!^2}\sum_{n=0}^\infty \frac{n(1/2)_n^2}{2^n n!^2}=\frac{1}{\pi}$ (where $(x)_n$ is the rising factorial)

$\sum_{n=1}^\infty \frac{(-1)^{n+1}}{n(n+1)(2n+1)}=\pi -3$ (Nilakantha series)

$\sum_{n=1}^\infty \frac{F_{2n}}{n^2 \binom{2n}{n}}=\frac{4\pi^2}{25\sqrt5}$ (where $F_{2n}$ is the $2n$th Fibonacci number)

$\sum_{n=1}^\infty \frac{L_{2n}}{n^2 \binom{2n}{n}}=\frac{\pi^2}{5}$ (where $L_n$ is the $n$th Lucas number)

$\sum_{n=1}^\infty \sigma(n)e^{-2\pi n}=\frac{1}{24}-\frac{1}{8\pi}$ (where $\sigma$ is the sum-of-divisors function)

$\pi = \sum_{n=1}^\infty \frac{(-1)^{\varepsilon (n)}}{n}=1 + \frac{1}{2} + \frac{1}{3} + \frac{1}{4} - \frac{1}{5} + \frac{1}{6} + \frac{1}{7} + \frac{1}{8} + \frac{1}{9} - \frac{1}{10} + \frac{1}{11} + \frac{1}{12} - \frac{1}{13} + \cdots$ (where $\varepsilon (n)$ is the number of prime factors of the form $p\equiv 1\,(\mathrm{mod}\,4)$ of $n$)

$\frac{\pi}{2}=\sum_{n=1}^\infty \frac{(-1)^{\varepsilon (n)}}{n}=1+\frac{1}{2}-\frac{1}{3}+\frac{1}{4}+\frac{1}{5}-\frac{1}{6}-\frac{1}{7}+\frac{1}{8}+\frac{1}{9}+\cdots$ (where $\varepsilon (n)$ is the number of prime factors of the form $p\equiv 3\, (\mathrm{mod}\, 4)$ of $n$)

$$\pi=\sum_{n=-\infty}^\infty \frac{(-1)^n}{n+1/2}$$

$\pi^2=\sum_{n=-\infty}^\infty \frac{1}{(n+1/2)^2}$

The last two formulas are special cases of

$$\begin{align}\frac{\pi}{\sin\pi x}&=\sum_{n=-\infty}^\infty \frac{(-1)^n}{n+x}\\
\left(\frac{\pi}{\sin \pi x}\right)^2&=\sum_{n=-\infty}^\infty \frac{1}{(n+x)^2}\end{align}$$

which generate infinitely many analogous formulas for $\pi$ when $x\in\mathbb{Q}\setminus\mathbb{Z}.$

$\pi=\sqrt{\sum_{n=1}^{\infty} \frac{6}{n^2}}$ (derived from Euler's solution to the Basel problem)

Some formulas relating π and harmonic numbers are given here. Further infinite series involving π are:

$\pi=\frac{1}{Z}$	$Z=\sum_{n=0}^{\infty } \frac{((2n)!)^3(42n+5)} {(n!)^6{16}^{3n+1}}$
$\pi=\frac{4}{Z}$	$Z=\sum_{n=0}^{\infty } \frac{(-1)^n(4n)!(21460n+1123)} {(n!)^4{441}^{2n+1}{2}^{10n+1}}$
$\pi=\frac{4}{Z}$	$Z=\sum_{n=0}^{\infty } \frac{(6n+1)\left ( \frac{1}{2} \right )^3_n} {{4^n}(n!)^3}$
$\pi=\frac{32}{Z}$	$Z=\sum_{n=0}^{\infty } \left (\frac{\sqrt{5}-1}{2} \right )^{8n} \frac{(42n\sqrt{5} +30n + 5\sqrt{5}-1) \left ( \frac{1}{2} \right )^3_n} {{64^n}(n!)^3}$
$\pi=\frac{27}{4Z}$	$Z=\sum_{n=0}^{\infty } \left (\frac{2}{27} \right )^n \frac{(15n+2)\left ( \frac{1}{2} \right )_n \left ( \frac{1}{3} \right )_n \left ( \frac{2}{3} \right )_n} {(n!)^3}$
$\pi=\frac{15\sqrt{3}}{2Z}$	$Z=\sum_{n=0}^{\infty } \left ( \frac{4}{125} \right )^n \frac{(33n+4)\left ( \frac{1}{2} \right )_n \left ( \frac{1}{3} \right )_n \left ( \frac{2}{3} \right )_n} {(n!)^3}$
$\pi=\frac{85\sqrt{85}}{18\sqrt{3}Z}$	$Z=\sum_{n=0}^{\infty } \left ( \frac{4}{85} \right )^n \frac{(133n+8)\left ( \frac{1}{2} \right )_n \left ( \frac{1}{6} \right )_n \left ( \frac{5}{6} \right )_n} {(n!)^3}$
$\pi=\frac{5\sqrt{5}}{2\sqrt{3}Z}$	$Z=\sum_{n=0}^{\infty } \left ( \frac{4}{125} \right )^n \frac{(11n+1)\left ( \frac{1}{2} \right )_n \left ( \frac{1}{6} \right )_n \left ( \frac{5}{6} \right )_n} {(n!)^3}$
$\pi=\frac{2\sqrt{3}}{Z}$	$Z=\sum_{n=0}^{\infty } \frac{(8n+1)\left ( \frac{1}{2} \right )_n \left ( \frac{1}{4} \right )_n \left ( \frac{3}{4} \right )_n} {(n!)^3{9}^{n}}$
$\pi=\frac{\sqrt{3}}{9Z}$	$Z=\sum_{n=0}^{\infty } \frac{(40n+3)\left ( \frac{1}{2} \right )_n \left ( \frac{1}{4} \right )_n \left ( \frac{3}{4} \right )_n} {(n!)^3{49}^{2n+1}}$
$\pi=\frac{2\sqrt{11}}{11Z}$	$Z=\sum_{n=0}^{\infty } \frac{(280n+19)\left ( \frac{1}{2} \right )_n \left ( \frac{1}{4} \right )_n \left ( \frac{3}{4} \right )_n} {(n!)^3{99}^{2n+1}}$
$\pi=\frac{\sqrt{2}}{4Z}$	$Z=\sum_{n=0}^{\infty } \frac{(10n+1) \left ( \frac{1}{2} \right )_n \left ( \frac{1}{4} \right )_n \left ( \frac{3}{4} \right )_n} {(n!)^3{9}^{2n+1}}$
$\pi=\frac{4\sqrt{5}}{5Z}$	$Z=\sum_{n=0}^{\infty } \frac{(644n+41) \left ( \frac{1}{2} \right )_n \left ( \frac{1}{4} \right )_n \left ( \frac{3}{4} \right )_n} {(n!)^35^n{72}^{2n+1}}$
$\pi=\frac{4\sqrt{3}}{3Z}$	$Z=\sum_{n=0}^\infty \frac{(-1)^n(28n+3) \left ( \frac{1}{2} \right )_n \left ( \frac{1}{4} \right )_n \left ( \frac{3}{4} \right )_n} { (n!)^3{3^n}{4}^{n+1}}$
$\pi=\frac{4}{Z}$	$Z=\sum_{n=0}^\infty \frac{(-1)^n(20n+3) \left ( \frac{1}{2} \right )_n \left ( \frac{1}{4} \right )_n \left ( \frac{3}{4} \right )_n} { (n!)^3{2}^{2n+1}}$
$\pi=\frac{72}{Z}$	$Z=\sum_{n=0}^\infty \frac{(-1)^n(4n)!(260n+23)}{(n!)^44^{4n}18^{2n}}$
$\pi=\frac{3528}{Z}$	$Z=\sum_{n=0}^\infty \frac{(-1)^n(4n)!(21460n+1123)}{(n!)^44^{4n}882^{2n}}$

where $(x)_n$ is the Pochhammer symbol for the rising factorial. See also Ramanujan–Sato series.

=== Machin-like formulae ===
$$\frac{\pi}{4} = \arctan 1$$

$$\frac{\pi}{4} = \arctan\frac{1}{2} + \arctan\frac{1}{3}$$

$$\frac{3\pi}{4} = \arctan 2 + \arctan 3$$

$$\frac{\pi}{4} = 2 \arctan\frac{1}{2} - \arctan\frac{1}{7}$$

$$\frac{\pi}{4} = 2 \arctan\frac{1}{3} + \arctan\frac{1}{7}$$

$\frac{\pi}{4} = 4 \arctan\frac{1}{5} - \arctan\frac{1}{239}$ (the original Machin's formula)

$$\frac{\pi}{4} = 5 \arctan\frac{1}{7} + 2 \arctan\frac{3}{79}$$

$$\frac{\pi}{4} = 6 \arctan\frac{1}{8} + 2 \arctan\frac{1}{57} + \arctan\frac{1}{239}$$

$$\frac{\pi}{4} = 12 \arctan\frac{1}{49} + 32 \arctan\frac{1}{57} - 5 \arctan\frac{1}{239} + 12 \arctan\frac{1}{110443}$$

$$\frac{\pi}{4} = 44 \arctan\frac{1}{57} + 7 \arctan\frac{1}{239} - 12 \arctan\frac{1}{682} + 24 \arctan\frac{1}{12943}$$

=== Infinite products ===
$\frac{\pi}{4} = \left(\prod_{p\equiv 1\pmod 4}\frac{p}{p-1}\right)\cdot\left( \prod_{p\equiv 3\pmod 4}\frac{p}{p+1}\right)=\frac{3}{4} \cdot \frac{5}{4} \cdot \frac{7}{8} \cdot \frac{11}{12} \cdot \frac{13}{12} \cdots,$ (Euler)

where the numerators are the odd primes; each denominator is the multiple of four nearest to the numerator.

$$\frac{\sqrt{3}\pi}{6}=\left(\displaystyle\prod_{p \equiv 1 \pmod{6} \atop p \in \mathbb{P} } \frac{p}{p-1}\right) \cdot \left(\displaystyle\prod_{p \equiv 5 \pmod{6} \atop p \in \mathbb{P} } \frac{p}{p+1}\right)=\frac{5}{6} \cdot \frac{7}{6} \cdot \frac{11}{12} \cdot \frac{13}{12} \cdot \frac{17}{18} \cdots$$

$$\frac{2\pi^2}{25}=\left(\displaystyle\prod_{p \equiv 1 \pmod{5} \atop p \in \mathbb{P} } \frac{p^2}{(p-1)^2}\right) \left(\displaystyle\prod_{p \equiv 2,3 \pmod{5} \atop p \in \mathbb{P} } \frac{p^2}{p^2+1}\right)\left(\displaystyle\prod_{p \equiv 4 \pmod{5} \atop p \in \mathbb{P} } \frac{p^2}{(p+1)^2}\right)=\frac{4}{5}\cdot\frac{9}{10}\cdot\frac{49}{50}\cdot\frac{121}{100}\cdot\frac{169}{170}\cdots$$,

Where p is p also the prime number.

$\frac{\pi}{2}=\prod_{n=1}^{\infty} \frac{(2n)(2n)}{(2n-1)(2n+1)} = \frac{2}{1} \cdot \frac{2}{3} \cdot \frac{4}{3} \cdot \frac{4}{5} \cdot \frac{6}{5} \cdot \frac{6}{7} \cdot \frac{8}{7} \cdot \frac{8}{9} \cdots$ (see also Wallis product)

$\frac{\pi}{2}=\prod_{n=1}^\infty\left(1+\frac{1}{n}\right)^{(-1)^{n+1}}=\left(1+\frac{1}{1}\right)^{+1}\left(1+\frac{1}{2}\right)^{-1}\left(1+\frac{1}{3}\right)^{+1}\cdots$ (another form of Wallis product)

Viète's formula:

$$\frac{2}{\pi}=\frac{\sqrt2}2 \cdot \frac{\sqrt{2+\sqrt2}}2 \cdot \frac{\sqrt{2+\sqrt{2+\sqrt2}}}2 \cdot \cdots$$

A double infinite product formula involving the Thue–Morse sequence:

$$\frac{\pi}{2}=\prod_{m\geq1} \prod_{n\geq1} \left( \frac{(4 m^2 + n - 2) (4 m^2 + 2 n - 1)^2}{4 (2 m^2 + n - 1) (4 m^2 + n - 1) (2 m^2 + n)} \right) ^{\epsilon_n},$$

where $\epsilon_n = (-1)^{t_n}$ and $t_n$ is the Thue–Morse sequence (Tóth 2020).

One elegant infinite product formula:

$$\pi=\prod_{n=1}^{\infty}\left(1+\frac{(n+2)+(2 n+1)+(2 n-1)}{(n+2) \times(2 n+1) \times(2 n-1)}\right)$$

=== Arctangent formulas ===
$$\frac{\pi}{2^{k+1}}=\arctan \frac{\sqrt{2-a_{k-1}}}{a_k}, \qquad\qquad k\geq 2$$
$$\frac{\pi}{4}=\sum_{k\geq 2}\arctan \frac{\sqrt{2-a_{k-1}}}{a_k},$$

where $a_k=\sqrt{2+a_{k-1}}$ such that $a_1=\sqrt{2}$.

$$\frac{\pi}{2} = \sum_{k=0}^\infty \arctan\frac{1}{F_{2k+1}} = \arctan\frac{1}{1} + \arctan\frac{1}{2} + \arctan\frac{1}{5} + \arctan\frac{1}{13} + \cdots$$

where $F_k$ is the $k$th Fibonacci number.

$\frac \pi 4 =\arctan \frac {a} {b+c} + \arctan \frac{b}{a+c},$

For Pythagorean triple (a,b,c).

$$\pi =\arctan a+\arctan b+\arctan c$$

whenever $a+b+c=abc$ and $a$, $b$, $c$ are positive real numbers (see List of trigonometric identities). A special case is

$$\pi =\arctan 1+\arctan 2+\arctan 3.$$

=== Complex functions ===
$e^{i \pi} +1 = 0$ (Euler's identity)

The following equivalences are true for any complex $z$:

$$e^z\in\mathbb{R}\leftrightarrow\Im z\in\pi\mathbb{Z}$$
$e^z=1\leftrightarrow z\in 2\pi i\mathbb{Z}$

Also

$$\frac{1}{e^z-1}=\lim_{N\to\infty}\sum_{n=-N}^N \frac{1}{z-2\pi i n}-\frac{1}{2},\quad z\in\mathbb{C}.$$

Suppose a lattice $\Omega$ is generated by two periods $\omega_1,\omega_2$. We define the quasi-periods of this lattice by $\eta_1=\zeta (z+\omega_1;\Omega)-\zeta (z;\Omega)$ and $\eta_2=\zeta (z+\omega_2;\Omega)-\zeta (z;\Omega)$ where $\zeta$ is the Weierstrass zeta function ($\eta_1$ and $\eta_2$ are in fact independent of $z$). Then the periods and quasi-periods are related by the Legendre identity:

$$\eta_1\omega_2-\eta_2\omega_1=2\pi i.$$

=== Continued fractions ===
$\frac{4}{\pi} = 1 + \cfrac{1^2}{2 + \cfrac{3^2}{2 + \cfrac{5^2}{2 + \cfrac{7^2}{2 + \ddots}}}}$

$\frac{\varpi^2}{\pi}= {2 + \cfrac{1^2}{4 + \cfrac{3^2}{4 + \cfrac{5^2}{4 + \cfrac{7^2}{4 + \ddots\,}}}}}\quad$ (Ramanujan, $\varpi$ is the lemniscate constant)

$\pi= {3 + \cfrac{1^2}{6 + \cfrac{3^2}{6 + \cfrac{5^2}{6 + \cfrac{7^2}{6 + \ddots\,}}}}}$

$$\pi = \cfrac{4}{1 + \cfrac{1^2}{3 + \cfrac{2^2}{5 + \cfrac{3^2}{7 + \cfrac{4^2}{9 + \ddots}}}}}$$

$$2\pi = {6 + \cfrac{2^2}{12 + \cfrac{6^2}{12 + \cfrac{10^2}{12+ \cfrac{14^2}{12 + \cfrac{18^2}{12 + \ddots}}}}}}$$

$$\pi=4-\cfrac{2}{1+ \cfrac{1}{1- \cfrac{1}{1+\cfrac{2}{ 1-\cfrac{2 }{ 1+\cfrac{3}{ 1-\cfrac{3 }{\ddots}}}}}}}$$

$\frac{2}{\pi}=\cfrac{1}{1+\cfrac{1}{1+\cfrac{2}{1+\cfrac{3}{1+\cfrac{3}{1+\cfrac{5}{\ddots}}}}}}$ (The partial numerators consist of two interleaved sequences: the sequence of natural numbers and the sequence of odd numbers, alternating by index.)

For more on the fourth identity, see Euler's continued fraction formula.

=== Iterative algorithms ===
$$a_0=1,\, a_{n+1}=\left(1+\frac{1}{2n+1}\right)a_n,\, \pi=\lim_{n\to\infty}\frac{a_n^2}{n}$$

$a_1=0,\, a_{n+1}=\sqrt{2+a_n},\, \pi =\lim_{n\to\infty} 2^n\sqrt{2-a_n}$ (closely related to Viète's formula)
$$\omega(i_n,i_{n-1},\dots,i_{1})=2+i_{n} \sqrt{2+i_{n-1} \sqrt{2+\cdots+i_{1} \sqrt{2}}}=\omega(b_n,b_{n-1},\dots,b_{1}),\, i_{k} \in\{-1,1\}, \, b_k=\begin{cases}
0& \text{if } i_k=1\\
1& \text{if } i_k=-1
\end{cases}, \, \pi={\displaystyle\lim _{n \rightarrow \infty} \frac{2^{n+1}}{2 h+1} \sqrt{\omega\left(\underbrace{10 \ldots 0}_{n-m} g_{m, h+1}\right)}}$$
(where $g_{m, h+1}$ is the h+1-th entry of m-bit Gray code, $h \in \left\{0,1, \ldots, 2^{m}-1\right\}$)

$\forall k \in \mathbb{N}, \, a_1 = 2^{ - k}, \, a_{n + 1} = a_n + 2^{ - k}(1 - \tan (2^{k - 1} a_n)), \, \pi = 2^{k + 1} \lim _{n \to \infty} a_n$ (quadratic convergence)

$a_1=1,\, a_{n+1}=a_n+\sin a_n,\, \pi =\lim_{n\to\infty}a_n$ (cubic convergence)

$a_0=2\sqrt{3},\, b_0=3,\, a_{n+1}=\operatorname{hm}(a_n,b_n),\, b_{n+1}=\operatorname{gm}(a_{n+1},b_n),\, \pi =\lim_{n\to\infty}a_n=\lim_{n\to\infty}b_n$ (Archimedes' algorithm, see also harmonic mean and geometric mean)

For more iterative algorithms, see the Gauss–Legendre algorithm and Borwein's algorithm.

=== Asymptotics ===
$\binom{2n}{n}\sim \frac{4^{n}}{\sqrt{\pi n}}$ (asymptotic growth rate of the central binomial coefficients)

$C_n\sim \frac{4^{n}}{\sqrt{\pi n^3}}$ (asymptotic growth rate of the Catalan numbers)

$n! \sim \sqrt{2 \pi n} \left(\frac{n}{e}\right)^n$ (Stirling's approximation)

$$\log n!\simeq \left(n+\frac12\right)\log n-n+\frac{\log 2\pi}{2}$$

$\sum_{k=1}^{n} \varphi (k) \sim \frac{3n^2}{\pi^2}$ (where $\varphi$ is Euler's totient function)

$$\sum_{k=1}^{n} \frac {\varphi (k)} {k} \sim \frac{6n}{\pi^2}$$

The symbol $\sim$ means that the ratio of the left-hand side and the right-hand side tends to one as $n\to\infty$.

The symbol $\simeq$ means that the difference between the left-hand side and the right-hand side tends to zero as $n\to\infty$.

=== Hypergeometric inversions ===
With ${}_2F_1$ being the hypergeometric function:

$$\sum_{n=0}^\infty r_2(n)q^n={}_2F_1\left(\frac12,\frac12,1,z\right)$$

where

$$q=\exp\left(-\pi \frac{{}_2F_1(1/2,1/2,1,1-z)}{{}_2F_1(1/2,1/2,1,z)}\right),\quad z\in\mathbb{C}\setminus\{0,1\}$$

and $r_2$ is the sum of two squares function.

Similarly,

$$1+240\sum_{n=1}^\infty \sigma_3(n)q^{n}={}_2F_1\left(\frac16,\frac56,1,z\right)^4$$

where

$$q=\exp\left(-2\pi \frac{{}_2F_1(1/6,5/6,1,1-z)}{{}_2F_1(1/6,5/6,1,z)}\right),\quad z\in\mathbb{C}\setminus\{0,1\}$$

and $\sigma_3$ is a divisor function.

More formulas of this nature can be given, as explained by Ramanujan's theory of elliptic functions to alternative bases.

Perhaps the most notable hypergeometric inversions are the following two examples, involving the Ramanujan tau function $\tau$ and the Fourier coefficients $\mathrm{j}$ of the J-invariant ((sequence A000521 in the OEIS)):

$$\sum_{n=-1}^\infty \mathrm{j}_nq^n=256\dfrac{(1-z+z^2)^3}{z^2(1-z)^2},$$
$$\sum_{n=1}^\infty \tau(n)q^n=\dfrac{z^2(1-z)^2}{256}{}_2F_1\left(\frac12,\frac12,1,z\right)^{12}$$

where in both cases

$$q=\exp\left(-2\pi \frac{{}_2F_1(1/2,1/2,1,1-z)}{{}_2F_1(1/2,1/2,1,z)}\right),\quad z\in\mathbb{C}\setminus\{0,1\}.$$

Furthermore, by expanding the last expression as a power series in

$$\dfrac{1}{2}\dfrac{1-(1-z)^{1/4}}{1+(1-z)^{1/4}}$$

and setting $z=1/2$, we obtain a rapidly convergent series for $e^{-2\pi}$: (Note: The coefficients can be obtained by reversing the Puiseux series of $$z\mapsto \sqrt{z}\dfrac{\sum_{n=0}^\infty z^{2n^2+2n}}{\sum_{o=-\infty}^\infty z^{2o^2}}$$ at $z=0$.)

$$e^{-2\pi}=w^2+4w^6+34w^{10}+360w^{14}+4239w^{18}+\cdots,\quad w=\dfrac{1}{2}\dfrac{2^{1/4}-1}{2^{1/4}+1}.$$

=== Miscellaneous ===
$\Gamma (s)\Gamma (1-s)=\frac{\pi}{\sin \pi s}$ (Euler's reflection formula, see Gamma function)

$\pi = \sqrt{6 \zeta(2)}$ (derived from Euler's solution to Basel problem, see Riemann zeta function)

$\pi^{-s/2}\Gamma \left(\frac{s}{2}\right)\zeta (s)=\pi^{-(1-s)/2}\Gamma\left(\frac{1-s}{2}\right)\zeta (1-s)$ (the functional equation of the Riemann zeta function)

$$e^{-\zeta'(0)}=\sqrt{2\pi}$$

$e^{\zeta'(0,1/2)-\zeta'(0,1)}=\sqrt{\pi}$ (where $\zeta (s,a)$ is the Hurwitz zeta function and the derivative is taken with respect to the first variable)

$\pi =\Beta (1/2,1/2)=\Gamma (1/2)^2$ (see also Beta function)

$\pi = \frac{\Gamma (3/4)^4}{\operatorname{agm}(1,1/\sqrt{2})^2}=\frac{\Gamma\left({1/4}\right)^{4/3} \operatorname{agm}(1, \sqrt{2})^{2/3}}{2}$ (where agm is the arithmetic–geometric mean)

$\pi = \operatorname{agm}\left(\theta_2^2(1/e),\theta_3^2(1/e)\right)$ (where $\theta_2$ and $\theta_3$ are the Jacobi theta functions)

$\operatorname{agm}(1,\sqrt{2})=\frac{\pi}{\varpi}$ (due to Gauss, $\varpi$ is the lemniscate constant)

$\operatorname{N}(2\varpi)=e^{2\pi},\quad \operatorname{N}(\varpi)=e^{\pi/2}$ (where $\operatorname{N}$ is the Gauss N-function)

$i\pi=\operatorname{Log}(-1)=\lim_{n\to\infty}n\left((-1)^{1/n}-1\right)$ (where $\operatorname{Log}$ is the principal value of the complex logarithm) (Note: The $n$th root with the smallest positive principal argument is chosen.)

$1-\frac{\pi^2}{12}=\lim_{n\rightarrow \infty}\frac{1}{n^2} \sum_{k=1}^n (n\bmod k)$ (where $n\bmod k$ is the remainder upon division of n by k)

$$\pi = \lim_{r \to \infty} \frac{1}{r^2} \sum_{x=-r}^{r} \; \sum_{y=-r}^{r} \begin{cases}
1 & \text{if } \sqrt{x^2+y^2} \le r \\
0 & \text{if } \sqrt{x^2+y^2} > r \end{cases}$$
(summing a circle's area)

$\pi = \lim_{n \rightarrow \infty} \frac{4}{n^2} \sum_{k=1}^n \sqrt{n^2 - k^2}$ (Riemann sum to evaluate the area of the unit circle)

$\pi = \lim_{n\to\infty}\frac{2^{4n}n!^4}{n(2n)!^2}=\lim_{n \rightarrow \infty} \frac{2^{4n}}{n {2n\choose n}^2} = \lim_{n \rightarrow \infty} \frac{1}{n}\left(\frac{(2n)!!}{(2n-1)!!}\right)^2$ (by combining Stirling's approximation with Wallis product)

$\pi=\lim_{n\to\infty}\frac{1}{n}\ln\frac{16}{\lambda (ni)}$ (where $\lambda$ is the modular lambda function) (Note: When $n\in\mathbb{Q}^+$, this gives algebraic approximations to Gelfond's constant $e^\pi$.)

$\pi=\lim_{n\to\infty}\frac{24}{\sqrt{n}}\ln \left(2^{1/4} G_n\right)=\lim_{n\to\infty}\frac{24}{\sqrt{n}}\ln \left(2^{1/4}g_n\right)$ (where $G_n$ and $g_n$ are Ramanujan's class invariants) (Note: When $\sqrt{n}\in\mathbb{Q}^+$, this gives algebraic approximations to Gelfond's constant $e^\pi$.)

== See also ==
- List of mathematical identities
- Lists of mathematics topics
- List of trigonometric identities
- List of topics related to π
- List of representations of e
