= Eugene Salamin =

Eugene Salamin may refer to:

- Eugene Salamin (mathematician), American mathematician
- Eugene Salamin (artist) (1912–2009), American painter
