= Richard Brent =

Richard Brent may refer to:

- Richard Brent (politician) (1757–1814), U.S. Congressman and senator from Virginia
- Richard P. Brent (born 1946), Australian mathematician and computer science professor

== See also ==
- R. Brent Tully (born 1943), Canadian-born American astronomer based in Hawaii
