= Geometric–harmonic mean =

In mathematics, the geometric–harmonic mean M(x, y) of two positive real numbers x and y is defined as follows: we form the geometric mean of g_{0} = x and h_{0} = y and call it g_{1}, i.e. g_{1} is the square root of xy. We also form the harmonic mean of x and y and call it h_{1}, i.e. h_{1} is the reciprocal of the arithmetic mean of the reciprocals of x and y. These may be done sequentially (in any order) or simultaneously.

Now we can iterate this operation with g_{1} taking the place of x and h_{1} taking the place of y. In this way, two interdependent sequences (g_{n}) and (h_{n}) are defined:

$$g_{n+1} = \sqrt{g_n h_n}$$

and

$$h_{n+1} = \frac{2{g_n}{h_n}}{g_n + h_n}$$

Both of these sequences converge to the same number, which we call the geometric–harmonic mean M(x, y) of x and y. The geometric–harmonic mean is also designated as the harmonic–geometric mean. (cf. Wolfram MathWorld below.)

The existence of the limit can be proved by the means of Bolzano–Weierstrass theorem in a manner almost identical to the proof of existence of arithmetic–geometric mean.

== Properties ==
M(x, y) is a number between the geometric and harmonic mean of x and y; in particular it is between x and y. M(x, y) is also homogeneous, i.e. if r > 0, then M(rx, ry) = r M(x, y).

If AG(x, y) is the arithmetic–geometric mean, then we also have

$$M(x,y) = \frac{1}{AG(\frac{1}{x},\frac{1}{y})}$$

== Inequalities ==
We have the following inequality involving the Pythagorean means {H, G, A} and iterated Pythagorean means {HG, HA, GA}:

$$\min(x,y) \leq H(x,y) \leq HG(x,y) \leq G(x,y) \leq GA(x,y) \leq A(x,y) \leq \max(x,y)$$

where the iterated Pythagorean means have been identified with their parts {H, G, A} in progressing order:

- H(x, y) is the harmonic mean,
- HG(x, y) is the harmonic–geometric mean,
- G(x, y) = HA(x, y) is the geometric mean (which is also the harmonic–arithmetic mean),
- GA(x, y) is the geometric–arithmetic mean,
- A(x, y) is the arithmetic mean.

== See also ==
- Arithmetic–geometric mean
- Arithmetic–harmonic mean
- Mean
