= Weber modular function =

In mathematics, the Weber modular functions are a family of three functions f, f_{1}, and f_{2}, (Note: f, f_{1} and f_{2} are not modular functions (per the Wikipedia definition), but every modular function is a rational function in f, f_{1} and f_{2}. Some authors use a non-equivalent definition of "modular functions".) studied by Heinrich Martin Weber.

== Definition ==
Let $q = e^{2\pi i \tau}$ where τ is an element of the upper half-plane. Then the Weber functions are

$$\begin{align}
\mathfrak{f}(\tau) &= q^{-\frac{1}{48}}\prod_{n>0}(1+q^{n-1/2}) = \frac{\eta^2(\tau)}{\eta\big(\tfrac{\tau}{2}\big)\eta(2\tau)} = e^{-\frac{\pi i}{24}}\frac{\eta\big(\frac{\tau+1}{2}\big)}{\eta(\tau)},\\
\mathfrak{f}_1(\tau) &= q^{-\frac{1}{48}}\prod_{n>0}(1-q^{n-1/2}) = \frac{\eta\big(\tfrac{\tau}{2}\big)}{\eta(\tau)},\\
\mathfrak{f}_2(\tau) &= \sqrt2\, q^{\frac{1}{24}}\prod_{n>0}(1+q^{n})= \frac{\sqrt2\,\eta(2\tau)}{\eta(\tau)}.
\end{align}$$

These are also the definitions in Duke's paper "Continued Fractions and Modular Functions". (Note: https://www.math.ucla.edu/~wdduke/preprints/bams4.pdf Continued Fractions and Modular Functions, W. Duke, pp 22-23) The function $\eta(\tau)$ is the Dedekind eta function and $(e^{2\pi i\tau})^{\alpha}$ should be interpreted as $e^{2\pi i\tau\alpha}$. The descriptions as $\eta$ quotients immediately imply

$$\mathfrak{f}(\tau)\mathfrak{f}_1(\tau)\mathfrak{f}_2(\tau) =\sqrt{2}.$$

The transformation τ → –1/τ fixes f and exchanges f_{1} and f_{2}. So the 3-dimensional complex vector space with basis f, f_{1} and f_{2} is acted on by the group SL_{2}(Z).

== Alternative infinite product ==
Alternatively, let $q = e^{\pi i \tau}$ be the nome,

$$\begin{align}
\mathfrak{f}(q) &= q^{-\frac{1}{24}}\prod_{n>0}(1+q^{2n-1}) =\frac{\eta^2(\tau)}{\eta\big(\tfrac{\tau}{2}\big)\eta(2\tau)},\\
\mathfrak{f}_1(q) &= q^{-\frac{1}{24}}\prod_{n>0}(1-q^{2n-1}) = \frac{\eta\big(\tfrac{\tau}{2}\big)}{\eta(\tau)},\\
\mathfrak{f}_2(q) &= \sqrt2\, q^{\frac{1}{12}}\prod_{n>0}(1+q^{2n})= \frac{\sqrt2\,\eta(2\tau)}{\eta(\tau)}.
\end{align}$$

The form of the infinite product has slightly changed. But since the eta quotients remain the same, then $\mathfrak{f}_i(\tau) = \mathfrak{f}_i(q)$ as long as the second uses the nome $q = e^{\pi i \tau}$. The utility of the second form is to show connections and consistent notation with the Ramanujan G- and g-functions and the Jacobi theta functions, both of which conventionally uses the nome.

== Relation to the Ramanujan G and g functions ==
Still employing the nome $q = e^{\pi i \tau}$, define the Ramanujan G- and g-functions as

$$\begin{align}
2^{1/4}G_n &= q^{-\frac{1}{24}}\prod_{n>0}(1+q^{2n-1}) = \frac{\eta^2(\tau)}{\eta\big(\tfrac{\tau}{2}\big)\eta(2\tau)},\\
2^{1/4}g_n &= q^{-\frac{1}{24}}\prod_{n>0}(1-q^{2n-1}) = \frac{\eta\big(\tfrac{\tau}{2}\big)}{\eta(\tau)}.
\end{align}$$

The eta quotients make their connection to the first two Weber functions immediately apparent. In the nome, assume $\tau=\sqrt{-n}.$ Then,

$$\begin{align}
2^{1/4}G_n &= \mathfrak{f}(q) = \mathfrak{f}(\tau),\\
2^{1/4}g_n &= \mathfrak{f}_1(q) = \mathfrak{f}_1(\tau).
\end{align}$$

Ramanujan found many relations between $G_n$ and $g_n$ which implies similar relations between $\mathfrak{f}(q)$ and $\mathfrak{f}_1(q)$. For example, his identity,

$$(G_n^8-g_n^8)(G_n\,g_n)^8 = \tfrac14,$$

leads to

$$\big[\mathfrak{f}^8(q)-\mathfrak{f}_1^8(q)\big] \big[\mathfrak{f}(q)\,\mathfrak{f}_1(q)\big]^8 = \big[\sqrt2\big]^8.$$

For many values of n, Ramanujan also tabulated $G_n$ for odd n, and $g_n$ for even n. This automatically gives many explicit evaluations of $\mathfrak{f}(q)$ and $\mathfrak{f}_1(q)$. For example, using $\tau = \sqrt{-5},\,\sqrt{-13},\,\sqrt{-37}$, which are some of the square-free discriminants with class number 2,

$$\begin{align}
G_5 &= \left(\frac{1+\sqrt{5}}{2}\right)^{1/4},\\
G_{13} &= \left(\frac{3+\sqrt{13}}{2}\right)^{1/4},\\
G_{37} &= \left(6+\sqrt{37}\right)^{1/4},
\end{align}$$

and one can easily get $\mathfrak{f}(\tau) = 2^{1/4}G_n$ from these, as well as the more complicated examples found in Ramanujan's Notebooks.

== Relation to Jacobi theta functions ==
The argument of the classical Jacobi theta functions is traditionally the nome $q = e^{\pi i \tau},$

$$\begin{align}
\vartheta_{10}(0;\tau)&=\theta_2(q)=\sum_{n=-\infty}^\infty q^{(n+1/2)^2} = \frac{2\eta^2(2\tau)}{\eta(\tau)},\\[2pt]
\vartheta_{00}(0;\tau)&=\theta_3(q)=\sum_{n=-\infty}^\infty q^{n^2} \;=\; \frac{\eta^5(\tau)}{\eta^2\left(\frac{\tau}{2}\right)\eta^2(2\tau)} = \frac{\eta^2\left(\frac{\tau+1}{2}\right)}{\eta(\tau+1)},\\[3pt]
\vartheta_{01}(0;\tau)&=\theta_4(q)=\sum_{n=-\infty}^\infty (-1)^n q^{n^2} = \frac{\eta^2\left(\frac{\tau}{2}\right)}{\eta(\tau)}.
\end{align}$$

Dividing them by $\eta(\tau)$, and also noting that $\eta(\tau) = e^\frac{-\pi i}{\,12}\eta(\tau+1)$, then they are just squares of the Weber functions $\mathfrak{f}_i(q)$

$$\begin{align}
\frac{\theta_2(q)}{\eta(\tau)} &= \mathfrak{f}_2(q)^2,\\[4pt]
\frac{\theta_4(q)}{\eta(\tau)} &= \mathfrak{f}_1(q)^2,\\[4pt]
\frac{\theta_3(q)}{\eta(\tau)} &= \mathfrak{f}(q)^2,
\end{align}$$

with even-subscript theta functions purposely listed first. Using the well-known Jacobi identity with even subscripts on the LHS,

$$\theta_2(q)^4+\theta_4(q)^4 = \theta_3(q)^4;$$

therefore,

$$\mathfrak{f}_2(q)^8+\mathfrak{f}_1(q)^8 = \mathfrak{f}(q)^8.$$

== Relation to j-function ==
The three roots of the cubic equation

$$j(\tau)=\frac{(x-16)^3}{x}$$

where j(τ) is the j-function are given by $x_i = \mathfrak{f}(\tau)^{24}, -\mathfrak{f}_1(\tau)^{24}, -\mathfrak{f}_2(\tau)^{24}$. Also, since,

$$j(\tau)=32\frac{\Big(\theta_2(q)^8+\theta_3(q)^8+\theta_4(q)^8\Big)^3}{\Big(\theta_2(q)\,\theta_3(q)\,\theta_4(q)\Big)^8}$$

and using the definitions of the Weber functions in terms of the Jacobi theta functions, plus the fact that $\mathfrak{f}_2(q)^2\, \mathfrak{f}_1(q)^2\,\mathfrak{f}(q)^2 = \frac{\theta_2(q)}{\eta(\tau)} \frac{\theta_4(q)}{\eta(\tau)} \frac{\theta_3(q)}{\eta(\tau)} = 2$, then

$$j(\tau)=\left(\frac{\mathfrak{f}(\tau)^{16}+\mathfrak{f}_1(\tau)^{16}+\mathfrak{f}_2(\tau)^{16}}{2}\right)^3 = \left(\frac{\mathfrak{f}(q)^{16}+\mathfrak{f}_1(q)^{16}+\mathfrak{f}_2(q)^{16}}{2}\right)^3$$

since $\mathfrak{f}_i(\tau) = \mathfrak{f}_i(q)$ and have the same formulas in terms of the Dedekind eta function $\eta(\tau)$.

== See also ==
- Ramanujan–Sato series, level 4
