= Ramanujan–Sato series =

Series related to Ramanujan's pi formulas

In mathematics, a Ramanujan–Sato series generalizes Ramanujan's pi formulas such as,

$$\frac{1}{\pi} = \frac{2 \sqrt 2}{99^2} \sum_{k=0}^\infty \frac{(4k)!}{k!^4} \frac{26390k+1103}{396^{4k}}$$

to the form

$$\frac{1}{\pi} = \sum_{k=0}^\infty s(k) \frac{Ak+B}{C^k}$$

by using other well-defined sequences of integers $s(k)$ obeying a certain recurrence relation, sequences which may be expressed in terms of binomial coefficients $\tbinom{n}{k}$, and $A,B,C$ employing modular forms of higher levels.

Ramanujan made the enigmatic remark that there were "corresponding theories", but it was only in 2012 that H. H. Chan and S. Cooper found a general approach that used the underlying modular congruence subgroup $\Gamma_0(n)$, while G. Almkvist has experimentally found numerous other examples also with a general method using differential operators.

Levels 1–4A were given by Ramanujan (1914), level 5 by H. H. Chan and S. Cooper (2012), 6A by Chan, Tanigawa, Yang, and Zudilin, 6B by Sato (2002), 6C by H. Chan, S. Chan, and Z. Liu (2004), 6D by H. Chan and H. Verrill (2009), level 7 by S. Cooper (2012), part of level 8 by Almkvist and Guillera (2012), part of level 10 by Y. Yang, and the rest by H. H. Chan and S. Cooper.

The notation j_{n}(τ) is derived from Zagier and T_{n} refers to the relevant McKay–Thompson series.

== Level 1 ==
Examples for levels 1–4 were given by Ramanujan in his 1917 paper. Given $q=e^{2\pi i \tau}$ as in the rest of this article. Let,

$$\begin{align}
j(\tau) &= \left(\frac{E_4(\tau)}{\eta^8(\tau)}\right)^3 = \frac{1}{q} + 744 + 196884q + 21493760q^2 +\cdots\\
j^*(\tau) &= 432\,\frac{\sqrt{j(\tau)}+ \sqrt{j(\tau)-1728}}{\sqrt{j(\tau)}- \sqrt{j(\tau)-1728}} = \frac{1}{q}  - 120 + 10260q - 901120q^2 + \cdots
\end{align}$$

with the j-function j(τ), Eisenstein series E_{4}, and Dedekind eta function η(τ). The first expansion is the McKay–Thompson series of class 1A (OEIS: A007240) with a(0) = 744. Note that, as first noticed by J. McKay, the coefficient of the linear term of j(τ) almost equals 196883, which is the degree of the smallest nontrivial irreducible representation of the monster group, a relationship called monstrous moonshine. Similar phenomena will be observed in the other levels. Define

$s_{1A}(k)=\binom{2k}{k}\binom{3k}{k}\binom{6k}{3k}=1, 120, 83160, 81681600,\ldots$ (OEIS: A001421)

$$s_{1B}(k)=\sum_{j=0}^k\binom{2j}{j}\binom{3j}{j}\binom{6j}{3j}\binom{k+j}{k-j}(-432)^{k-j} =1, -312, 114264, -44196288,\ldots$$

Then the two modular functions and sequences are related by

$$\sum_{k=0}^\infty s_{1A}(k)\,\frac{1}{(j(\tau))^{k+\frac12}}= \pm \sum_{k=0}^\infty s_{1B}(k)\,\frac{1}{(j^*(\tau))^{k+\frac12}}$$

if the series converges and the sign chosen appropriately, though squaring both sides easily removes the ambiguity. Analogous relationships exist for the higher levels.

Examples:

$$\frac{1}{\pi} = 12\,\boldsymbol{i}\,\sum_{k=0}^\infty s_{1A}(k)\,\frac{163\cdot3344418k+13591409}{\left(-640320^3\right)^{k+\frac12}},\quad j\left(\frac{1+\sqrt{-163}}{2}\right)=-640320^3=-262537412640768000$$

$$\frac{1}{\pi} = 24\,\boldsymbol{i}\,\sum_{k=0}^\infty s_{1B}(k)\,\frac{-3669+320\sqrt{645}\,\left(k+\frac12\right)}{\left({-432}\,U_{645}^3\right)^{k+\frac12}},\quad j^*\left(\frac{1+\sqrt{-43}}{2}\right) = -432\,U_{645}^{3}=-432\left(\frac{127+5\sqrt{645}}{2}\right)^{3}$$

where $645=43\times15,$ and $U_n$ is a fundamental unit. The first belongs to a family of formulas that were rigorously proven by the Chudnovsky brothers in 1989 and later used to calculate 10 trillion digits of π in 2011. The second formula, and the ones for higher levels, were established by H.H. Chan and S. Cooper in 2012.

== Level 2 ==
Using Zagier's notation for the modular function of level 2,

$$\begin{align}
j_{2A}(\tau) &=\left(\left(\frac{\eta(\tau)}{\eta(2\tau)}\right)^{12}+2^6 \left(\frac{\eta(2\tau)}{\eta(\tau)}\right)^{12}\right)^2 = \frac{1}{q} + 104 + 4372q + 96256q^2 + 1240002q^3+\cdots \\
j_{2B}(\tau) &= \left(\frac{\eta(\tau)}{\eta(2\tau)}\right)^{24} = \frac{1}{q} - 24 + 276q - 2048q^2 + 11202q^3 - \cdots
\end{align}$$

Note that the coefficient of the linear term of j_{2A}(τ) is one more than 4371 which is the smallest degree greater than 1 of the irreducible representations of the Baby Monster group. Define,

$s_{2A}(k)=\binom{2k}{k}\binom{2k}{k}\binom{4k}{2k}=1, 24, 2520, 369600, 63063000,\ldots$ (OEIS: A008977)

$$s_{2B}(k)=\sum_{j=0}^k\binom{2j}{j}\binom{2j}{j}\binom{4j}{2j}\binom{k+j}{k-j}(-64)^{k-j}=1, -40, 2008, -109120, 6173656,\ldots$$

Then,

$$\sum_{k=0}^\infty s_{2A}(k)\,\frac{1}{(j_{2A}(\tau))^{k+\frac12}}= \pm \sum_{k=0}^\infty s_{2B}(k)\,\frac{1}{(j_{2B}(\tau))^{k+\frac12}}$$

if the series converges and the sign chosen appropriately.

Examples:

$$\frac{1}{\pi} = 32\sqrt{2}\,\sum_{k=0}^\infty s_{2A}(k)\,\frac{58\cdot455k+1103}{\left(396^4\right)^{k+\frac12}},\quad j_{2A}\left(\frac\sqrt{-58}{2}\right)=396^4=24591257856$$

$$\frac{1}{\pi} = 16\sqrt{2}\,\sum_{k=0}^\infty s_{2B}(k)\,\frac{-24184+9801\sqrt{29}\, \left(k+\frac12\right)}{\left(64\,U_{29}^{12}\right)^{k+\frac12}},\quad j_{2B}\left(\frac\sqrt{-58}{2}\right)=64\left(\frac{5+\sqrt{29}}{2}\right)^{12}=64\,U_{29}^{12}$$

The first formula, found by Ramanujan and mentioned at the start of the article, belongs to a family proven by D. Bailey and the Borwein brothers in a 1989 paper.

== Level 3 ==
Define,

$$\begin{align}
j_{3A}(\tau) &=\left(\left(\frac{\eta(\tau)}{\eta(3\tau)}\right)^{6}+3^3 \left(\frac{\eta(3\tau)}{\eta(\tau)}\right)^{6}\right)^2 = \frac{1}{q} + 42 + 783q + 8672q^2 +65367q^3+\cdots\\
j_{3B}(\tau) &= \left(\frac{\eta(\tau)}{\eta(3\tau)}\right)^{12} = \frac{1}{q} - 12 + 54q - 76q^2 - 243q^3 + 1188q^4 +  \cdots\\
\end{align}$$

where 782 is the smallest degree greater than 1 of the irreducible representations of the Fischer group Fi_{23} and,

$s_{3A}(k)=\binom{2k}{k}\binom{2k}{k}\binom{3k}{k}=1, 12, 540, 33600, 2425500,\ldots$ (OEIS: A184423)

$$s_{3B}(k)=\sum_{j=0}^k\binom{2j}{j}\binom{2j}{j}\binom{3j}{j}\binom{k+j}{k-j}(-27)^{k-j}=1, -15, 297, -6495, 149481,\ldots$$

Examples:

$$\frac{1}{\pi} = 2\,\boldsymbol{i}\,\sum_{k=0}^\infty s_{3A}(k)\,\frac{267\cdot53k+827}{\left(-300^3\right)^{k+\frac12}},\quad j_{3A}\left(\frac{3+\sqrt{-267}}{6}\right) = -300^3 = -27000000$$

$$\frac{1}{\pi} = \boldsymbol{i}\,\sum_{k=0}^\infty s_{3B}(k)\,\frac{12497-3000\sqrt{89}\, \left(k+\frac12\right)}{\left(-27\,U_{89}^{2}\right)^{k+\frac12}},\quad j_{3B}\left(\frac{3+\sqrt{-267}}{6}\right)=-27\,\left(500+53\sqrt{89}\right)^2=-27\,U_{89}^{2}$$

== Level 4 ==
Define,

$$\begin{align}
j_{4A}(\tau)&=\left(\left(\frac{\eta(\tau)}{\eta(4\tau)}\right)^{4}+4^2 \left(\frac{\eta(4\tau)}{\eta(\tau)}\right)^{4}\right)^2 = \left(\frac{\eta^2(2\tau)}{\eta(\tau)\,\eta(4\tau)} \right)^{24} =-\left(\frac{\eta\left(\frac{2\tau+3}{2}\right)}{\eta(2\tau+3)} \right)^{24} = \frac{1}{q} + 24+ 276q + 2048q^2 +11202q^3+\cdots\\
j_{4C}(\tau) &= \left(\frac{\eta(\tau)}{\eta(4\tau)}\right)^{8} = \frac{1}{q} -8 + 2
q - 62q^3 + 216q^5 - 641q^7 +  \ldots\\
\end{align}$$

where the first is the 24th power of the Weber modular function $\mathfrak{f}(2\tau)$. And,

$s_{4A}(k)=\binom{2k}{k}^3=1, 8, 216, 8000, 343000,\ldots$ (OEIS: A002897)

$s_{4C}(k)=\sum_{j=0}^k\binom{2j}{j}^3\binom{k+j}{k-j}(-16)^{k-j}= (-1)^k \sum_{j=0}^k\binom{2j}{j}^2\binom{2k-2j}{k-j}^2 =1, -8, 88, -1088, 14296,\ldots$ (OEIS: A036917)

Examples:

$$\frac{1}{\pi} = 8\,\boldsymbol{i}\,\sum_{k=0}^\infty s_{4A}(k)\,\frac{6k+1}{\left(-2^9\right)^{k+\frac12}},\quad j_{4A}\left(\frac{1+\sqrt{-4}}{2}\right)=-2^9=-512$$

$$\frac{1}{\pi} = 16\,\boldsymbol{i}\,\sum_{k=0}^\infty s_{4C}(k)\,\frac{1-2\sqrt{2}\, \left(k+\frac12\right)}{\left(-16\,U_{2}^{4}\right)^{k+\frac12}},\quad j_{4C}\left(\frac{1+\sqrt{-4}}{2}\right) = -16\,\left(1+\sqrt{2}\right)^4=-16\,U_{2}^{4}$$

== Level 5 ==
Define,

$$\begin{align}
j_{5A}(\tau)&=\left(\frac{\eta(\tau)}{\eta(5\tau)}\right)^{6}+5^3 \left(\frac{\eta(5\tau)}{\eta(\tau)}\right)^{6}+22 =\frac{1}{q} + 16 + 134q + 760q^2 +3345q^3+\cdots\\
j_{5B}(\tau)&=\left(\frac{\eta(\tau)}{\eta(5\tau)}\right)^{6}= \frac{1}{q}- 6 + 9q + 10q^2 - 30q^3 + 6q^4 + \cdots
\end{align}$$

and,

$$s_{5A}(k)=\binom{2k}{k}\sum_{j=0}^k \binom{k}{j}^2\binom{k+j}{j} =1, 6, 114, 2940, 87570,\ldots$$

$s_{5B}(k)=\sum_{j=0}^k(-1)^{j+k}\binom{k}{j}^3\binom{4k-5j}{3k}=1, -5, 35, -275, 2275, -19255,\ldots$ (OEIS: A229111)

where the first is the product of the central binomial coefficients and the Apéry numbers (OEIS: A005258)

Examples:

$$\frac{1}{\pi} = \frac{5}{9}\,\boldsymbol{i}\,\sum_{k=0}^\infty s_{5A}(k)\,\frac{682k+71}{(-15228)^{k+\frac12}},\quad j_{5A}\left(\frac{5+\sqrt{-5(47)}}{10}\right)=-15228=-(18\sqrt{47})^2$$

$$\frac{1}{\pi} = \frac{6}{\sqrt{5}}\,\boldsymbol{i}\,\sum_{k=0}^\infty s_{5B}(k)\,\frac{25\sqrt{5}-141\left(k+\frac12\right)}{\left(-5\sqrt{5}\,U_{5}^{15}\right)^{k+\frac12}},\quad j_{5B}\left(\frac{5+\sqrt{-5(47)}}{10}\right)=-5\sqrt{5}\,\left(\frac{1+\sqrt{5}}{2}\right)^{15}=-5\sqrt{5}\,U_{5}^{15}$$

== Level 6 ==
=== Modular functions ===
In 2002, Takeshi Sato established the first results for levels above 4. It involved Apéry numbers which were first used to establish the irrationality of $\zeta(3)$. First, define,

$$\begin{align}j_{6A}(\tau) &=\left(\sqrt{j_{6B}(\tau)} - \frac{1}{\sqrt{j_{6B}(\tau)}}\right)^2 = \left(\sqrt{j_{6C}(\tau)} + \frac{8}{\sqrt{j_{6C}(\tau)}}\right)^2 = \left(\sqrt{j_{6D}(\tau)} + \frac{9}{\sqrt{j_{6D}(\tau)}}\right)^2-4 =\frac{1}{q} + 10 + 79q + 352q^2 +\cdots
\end{align}$$

$$\begin{align}j_{6B}(\tau) &= \left(\frac{\eta(2\tau)\eta(3\tau)}{\eta(\tau)\eta(6\tau)}\right)^{12}=\frac{1}{q} + 12 + 78q + 364q^2 + 1365q^3+\cdots
\end{align}$$

$$\begin{align}j_{6C}(\tau) &= \left(\frac{\eta(\tau)\eta(3\tau)}{\eta(2\tau)\eta(6\tau)}\right)^{6}=\frac{1}{q} -6 + 15q -32q^2 + 87q^3-192q^4+\cdots
\end{align}$$

$$\begin{align}j_{6D}(\tau) &= \left(\frac{\eta(\tau)\eta(2\tau)}{\eta(3\tau)\eta(6\tau)}\right)^{4}=\frac{1}{q} -4 - 2q + 28q^2 - 27q^3 - 52q^4+\cdots\end{align}$$

$$\begin{align}j_{6E}(\tau) &= \left(\frac{\eta(2\tau)\eta^3(3\tau)}{\eta(\tau)\eta^3(6\tau)}\right)^{3}=\frac{1}{q} +3 + 6q + 4q^2 - 3q^3 - 12q^4 +\cdots\end{align}$$

The phenomenon of $j_{6A}$ being squares or a near-square of the other functions will also be manifested by $j_{10A}$. Another similarity between levels 6 and 10 is J. Conway and S. Norton showed there are linear relations between the McKay–Thompson series T_{n}, one of which was,

$$T_{6A}-T_{6B}-T_{6C}-T_{6D}+2T_{6E} = 0$$

or using the above eta quotients j_{n},

$$j_{6A}-j_{6B}-j_{6C}-j_{6D}+2j_{6E} = 22$$

A similar relation exists for level 10.

=== α Sequences ===
For the modular function j_{6A}, one can associate it with three different sequences. (A similar situation happens for the level 10 function j_{10A}.) Let,

$\alpha_1(k)=\binom{2k}{k}\sum_{j=0}^k \binom{k}{j}^3 =1, 4, 60, 1120, 24220,\ldots$ (OEIS: A181418, labeled as s_{6} in Cooper's paper)

$\alpha_2(k)=\binom{2k}{k}\sum_{j=0}^k \binom{k}{j}\sum_{m=0}^j\binom{j}{m}^3=\binom{2k}{k}\sum_{j=0}^k \binom{k}{j}^2\binom{2j}{j} =1, 6, 90, 1860, 44730,\ldots$ (OEIS: A002896)

$$\alpha_3(k)=\binom{2k}{k}\sum_{j=0}^k \binom{k}{j}(-8)^{k-j}\sum_{m=0}^j\binom{j}{m}^3 =1, -12, 252, -6240, 167580, -4726512,\ldots$$

The three sequences involve the product of the central binomial coefficients $c(k)=\tbinom{2k}{k}$ with: first, the Franel numbers $\textstyle\sum_{j=0}^k \tbinom{k}{j}^3$; second, OEIS: A002893, and third, $(-1)^k$ OEIS: A093388. Note that the second sequence, α_{2}(k) is also the number of 2n-step polygons on a cubic lattice. Their complements,

$$\alpha'_2(k)=\binom{2k}{k}\sum_{j=0}^k \binom{k}{j}(-1)^{k-j}\sum_{m=0}^j\binom{j}{m}^3 =1, 2, 42, 620, 12250,\ldots$$

$$\alpha'_3(k)=\binom{2k}{k}\sum_{j=0}^k \binom{k}{j}(8)^{k-j}\sum_{m=0}^j\binom{j}{m}^3 =1, 20, 636, 23840, 991900,\ldots$$

There are also associated sequences, namely the Apéry numbers,

$s_{6B}(k)=\sum_{j=0}^k \binom{k}{j}^2\binom{k+j}{j}^2 =1, 5, 73, 1445, 33001,\ldots$ (OEIS: A005259)

the Domb numbers (unsigned) or the number of 2n-step polygons on a diamond lattice,

$s_{6C}(k)=(-1)^k \sum_{j=0}^k \binom{k}{j}^2 \binom{2(k-j)}{k-j} \binom{2j}{j} =1, -4, 28, -256, 2716,\ldots$ (OEIS: A002895)

and the Almkvist-Zudilin numbers,

$s_{6D}(k)=\sum_{j=0}^k (-1)^{k-j}\,3^{k-3j}\,\frac{(3j)!}{j!^3} \binom{k}{3j} \binom{k+j}{j} =1, -3, 9, -3, -279, 2997,\ldots$ (OEIS: A125143)

where

$$\frac{(3j)!}{j!^3}=\binom{2j}{j}\binom{3j}{j}$$

=== Identities ===
The modular functions can be related as,

$$P = \sum_{k=0}^\infty \alpha_1(k)\,\frac{1}{\left(j_{6A}(\tau)\right)^{k+\frac12}} =  \sum_{k=0}^\infty \alpha_2(k)\,\frac{1}{\left(j_{6A}(\tau)+4\right)^{k+\frac12}} = \sum_{k=0}^\infty \alpha_3(k)\,\frac{1}{\left(j_{6A}(\tau)-32\right)^{k+\frac12}}$$

$$Q = \sum_{k=0}^\infty s_{6B}(k)\,\frac{1}{\left(j_{6B}(\tau)\right)^{k+\frac12}}= \sum_{k=0}^\infty s_{6C}(k)\,\frac{1}{\left(j_{6C}(\tau)\right)^{k+\frac12}}= \sum_{k=0}^\infty s_{6D}(k)\,\frac{1}{\left(j_{6D}(\tau)\right)^{k+\frac12}}$$

if the series converges and the sign chosen appropriately. It can also be observed that,

$$P = Q = \sum_{k=0}^\infty \alpha'_2(k)\,\frac{1}{\left(j_{6A}(\tau)-4\right)^{k+\frac12}} = \sum_{k=0}^\infty \alpha'_3(k)\,\frac{1}{\left(j_{6A}(\tau)+32\right)^{k+\frac12}}$$

which implies,

$$\sum_{k=0}^\infty \alpha_2(k)\,\frac{1}{\left(j_{6A}(\tau)+4\right)^{k+\frac12}} = \sum_{k=0}^\infty \alpha'_2(k)\,\frac{1}{\left(j_{6A}(\tau)-4\right)^{k+\frac12}}$$

and similarly using α_{3} and α'_{3}.

=== Examples ===
One can use a value for j_{6A} in three ways. For example, starting with,

$$\Delta=j_{6A}\left(\sqrt{\frac{-17}{6}}\right)=198^2-4=\left(140\sqrt{2}\right)^2=39200$$

and noting that $3\cdot17=51$ then,

$$\begin{align}
\frac{1}{\pi} &= \frac{24\sqrt{3}}{35}\,\sum_{k=0}^\infty \alpha_1(k)\,\frac{51\cdot11k+53}{(\Delta)^{k+\frac12}}\\
\frac{1}{\pi} &= \frac{4\sqrt{3}}{99}\,\sum_{k=0}^\infty \alpha_2(k)\,\frac{17\cdot560k+899}{(\Delta+4)^{k+\frac12}}\\
\frac{1}{\pi} &= \frac{\sqrt{3}}{2}\,\sum_{k=0}^\infty \alpha_3(k)\,\frac{770k+73}{(\Delta-32)^{k+\frac12}}\\
\end{align}$$

as well as,

$$\begin{align}
\frac{1}{\pi} &= \frac{12\sqrt{3}}{9799}\,\sum_{k=0}^\infty \alpha'_2(k)\,\frac{11\cdot51\cdot560k+29693}{(\Delta-4)^{k+\frac12}}\\
\frac{1}{\pi} &= \frac{6\sqrt{3}}{613}\,\sum_{k=0}^\infty \alpha'_3(k)\,\frac{51\cdot770k+3697}{(\Delta+32)^{k+\frac12}}\\
\end{align}$$

though the formulas using the complements apparently do not yet have a rigorous proof. For the other modular functions,

$$\frac{1}{\pi} = 8\sqrt{15}\,\sum_{k=0}^\infty s_{6B}(k)\,\left(\frac12-\frac{3\sqrt{5}}{20}+k\right)\left(\frac{1}{\phi^{12}}\right)^{k+\frac12},
\quad j_{6B}\left(\sqrt{\frac{-5}{6}}\right)=\left(\frac{1+\sqrt{5}}{2}\right)^{12}=\phi^{12}$$

$$\frac{1}{\pi} = \frac12\,\sum_{k=0}^\infty s_{6C}(k)\,\frac{3k+1}{32^k},
\quad j_{6C}\left(\sqrt{\frac{-1}{3}}\right)=32$$

$$\frac{1}{\pi} = 2\sqrt{3}\,\sum_{k=0}^\infty s_{6D}(k)\,\frac{4k+1}{81^{k+\frac12}},
\quad j_{6D}\left(\sqrt{\frac{-1}{2}}\right)=81$$

== Level 7 ==
Define

$s_{7A}(k)=\sum_{j=0}^k \binom{k}{j}^2\binom{2j}{k}\binom{k+j}{j} =1, 4, 48, 760, 13840,\ldots$ (OEIS: A183204)

and,

$$\begin{align}
j_{7A}(\tau) &=\left(\left(\frac{\eta(\tau)}{\eta(7\tau)}\right)^{2}+7 \left(\frac{\eta(7\tau)}{\eta(\tau)}\right)^{2}\right)^2=\frac{1}{q} +10 + 51q + 204q^2 +681q^3+\cdots\\
j_{7B}(\tau)&=\left(\frac{\eta(\tau)}{\eta(7\tau)}\right)^{4}= \frac{1}{q}- 4 + 2q + 8q^2 - 5q^3 - 4q^4 - 10q^5 + \cdots
\end{align}$$

Example:

$$\frac{1}{\pi} = \frac{\sqrt{7}}{22^3}\,\sum_{k=0}^\infty s_{7A}(k)\, \frac{11895k+1286}{\left(-22^3\right)^{k}},
\quad j_{7A}\left(\frac{7+\sqrt{-427}}{14}\right) = -22^3+1 = -\left(39\sqrt{7}\right)^2=-10647$$

No pi formula has yet been found using j_{7B}.

== Level 8 ==
=== Modular functions ===
Levels $2, 4, 8$ are related since they are just powers of the same prime. Define,

$$\begin{align}
j_{4B}(\tau)
&=\sqrt{j_{2A}(2\tau)} = \left( \sqrt{j_{4D}(\tau)} + \frac{8}{\sqrt{j_{4D}(\tau)}} \right)^2 -16 = \left( \sqrt{j_{8A}(\tau)} - \frac{4}{\sqrt{j_{8A}(\tau)}} \right)^2 = \left( \sqrt{j_{8A'}(\tau)} + \frac{4}{\sqrt{j_{8A'}(\tau)}} \right)^2\\
&=\left(\frac{\eta(2\tau)}{\eta(4\tau)}\right)^{12}+2^6 \left(\frac{\eta(4\tau)}{\eta(2\tau)}\right)^{12} = \frac{1}{q} + 52q + 834q^3 + 4760q^5 + 24703q^7+\cdots\\
j_{4D}(\tau)&= \left(\frac{\eta(2\tau)}{\eta(4\tau)}\right)^{12} =\frac{1}{q} - 12q + 66q^3 - 232q^5 + 639q^7 - 1596q^9 + \cdots\\
j_{8A}(\tau)&=\left(\frac{\eta(2\tau)\,\eta(4\tau)}{\eta(\tau)\,\eta(8\tau)}\right)^{8}=\frac{1}{q} + 8 + 36q + 128q^2 + 386q^3 +1024q^4+\cdots\\
j_{8A'}(\tau)&=\left(\frac{\eta(\tau)\,\eta^2(4\tau)}{\eta^2(2\tau)\,\eta(8\tau)}\right)^{8}=\frac{1}{q} - 8 + 36q - 128q^2 + 386q^3 -1024q^4+\cdots\\
j_{8B}(\tau)&=\left(\frac{\eta^2(4\tau)}{\eta(2\tau)\,\eta(8\tau)}\right)^{12}=\sqrt{j_{4A}(2\tau)}=\frac{1}{q} + 12q + 66q^3 + 232q^5 + 639q^7+\cdots\\
j_{8E}(\tau)&=\left(\frac{\eta^3(4\tau)}{\eta(2\tau)\,\eta^2(8\tau)}\right)^{4} =\frac{1}{q} + 4q + 2q^3 - 8q^5 - q^7 + 20q^9 - 2q^{11} - 40q^{13} +\cdots
\end{align}$$

Just like for level 6, five of these functions have a linear relationship,

$$j_{4B}-j_{4D}-j_{8A}-j_{8A'}+2j_{8E} = 0$$

But this is not one of the nine Conway-Norton-Atkin linear dependencies since $j_{8A'}$ is not a moonshine function. However, it is related to one as,

$$j_{8A'}(\tau) = -j_{8A}\Big(\tau+\tfrac12\Big)$$

=== Sequences ===
$$s_{4B}(k)=\binom{2k}{k}\sum_{j=0}^k 4^{k-2j}\binom{k}{2j}\binom{2j}{j}^2 =\binom{2k}{k}\sum_{j=0}^k \binom{k}{j}\binom{2k-2j}{k-j}\binom{2j}{j}=1, 8, 120, 2240, 47320,\ldots$$

$$s_{4D}(k)=\binom{2k}{k}^3=1, 8, 216, 8000, 343000,\ldots$$

$s_{8A}(k)=\sum_{j=0}^k \binom{k}{j}^2\binom{2j}{k}^2 =1, 4, 40, 544, 8536,\ldots$ (OEIS: A290575)

$$s_{8B}(k)=\sum_{j=0}^k \binom{2j}{j}^3\binom{2k-4j}{k-2j} =1, 2, 14, 36, 334,\ldots$$

where the first is the product of the central binomial coefficient and a sequence related to an arithmetic-geometric mean (OEIS: A081085).

=== Identities ===
The modular functions can be related as,

$$\pm\sum_{k=0}^\infty s_{4B}(k)\,\frac{1}{\left(j_{4B}(\tau)+16\right)^{k+\frac12}} =  \sum_{k=0}^\infty s_{4D}(k)\,\frac{1}{\left(j_{4D}(\tau)\right)^{2k+\frac12}} = \sum_{k=0}^\infty s_{8A}(k)\,\frac{1}{\left(j_{8A}(\tau)\right)^{k+\frac12}} = \sum_{k=0}^\infty (-1)^k s_{8A}(k)\,\frac{1}{\left(j_{8A'}(\tau)\right)^{k+\frac12}}$$

if the series converges and signs chosen appropriately. Note also the different exponent of $\left(j_{4D}(\tau)\right)^{2k+\frac12}$ from the others.

=== Examples ===
Recall that $j_{2A}\left(\tfrac\sqrt{-58}{2}\right)=396^4,$ while $j_{4B}\left(\tfrac\sqrt{-58}{4}\right)=396^2$. Hence,

$$\frac{1}{\pi} = \frac{2\sqrt{2}}{13}\,\sum_{k=0}^\infty s_{4B}(k)\,\frac{70\cdot99\,k+579}{\left(396^2+16\right)^{k+\frac12}},\qquad j_{4B}\left(\frac\sqrt{-58}{4}\right)=396^2$$

$$\frac{1}{\pi} = 2\sqrt{2}\,\sum_{k=0}^\infty s_{8A}(k)\,\frac{-222+70\sqrt{58}\,\left(k+\frac12\right)}{\left(4\left(99+13\sqrt{58}\right)^{2}\right)^{k+\frac12}},\qquad j_{8A}\left(\frac\sqrt{-58}{4}\right)=4\left(99+13\sqrt{58}\right)^{2}=4U_{58}^2$$

$$\frac{1}{\pi} = 2\,\sum_{k=0}^\infty (-1)^k s_{8A}(k)\,\frac{-222\sqrt{2}+13\times58\,\left(k+\frac12\right)}{\left(4\left(1+\sqrt{2}\right)^{12}\right)^{k+\frac12}},\qquad j_{8A'}\left(\frac\sqrt{-58}{4}\right)=4\left(1+\sqrt{2}\right)^{12}=4U_{2}^{12},$$

For another level 8 example,

$$\frac{1}{\pi} = \frac1{16}\sqrt{\frac35}\,\sum_{k=0}^\infty s_{8B}(k)\,\frac{210k+43}{(64)^{k+\frac12}},\qquad j_{8B}\left(\frac\sqrt{-7}{4}\right)=2^6=64$$

== Level 9 ==
Define,

$$\begin{align}
j_{3C}(\tau) &= \left(j(3\tau)\right)^\frac13 =-6+\left(\frac{\eta^2(3\tau)}{\eta(\tau)\,\eta(9\tau)}\right)^6 -27 \left(\frac{\eta(\tau)\,\eta(9\tau)}{\eta^2(3\tau)}\right)^6=\frac{1}{q} + 248q^2 + 4124q^5 +34752q^8+\cdots\\
j_{9A}(\tau) &= \left(\frac{\eta^2(3\tau)}{\eta(\tau)\,\eta(9\tau)}\right)^6 = \frac{1}{q} + 6 + 27q + 86q^2 + 243q^3 + 594q^4+\cdots\\
\end{align}$$

The expansion of the first is the McKay–Thompson series of class 3C (and related to the cube root of the j-function), while the second is that of class 9A. Let,

$$s_{3C}(k)=\binom{2k}{k}\sum_{j=0}^k (-3)^{k-3j}\binom{k}{j}\binom{k-j}{j}\binom{k-2j}{j} =\binom{2k}{k}\sum_{j=0}^k(-3)^{k-3j}\binom{k}{3j}\binom{2j}{j}\binom{3j}{j} = 1, -6, 54, -420, 630,\ldots$$

$$s_{9A}(k)=\sum_{j=0}^k\binom{k}{j}^2\sum_{m=0}^j\binom{k}{m}\binom{j}{m}\binom{j+m}{k} =1, 3, 27, 309, 4059,\ldots$$

where the first is the product of the central binomial coefficients and OEIS: A006077 (though with different signs).

Examples:

$$\frac{1}{\pi} = \frac{-\boldsymbol{i}}{9}\sum_{k=0}^\infty s_{3C}(k)\,\frac{602k+85}{\left(-960-12\right)^{k+\frac12}},\quad j_{3C}\left(\frac{3+\sqrt{-43}}{6}\right)=-960$$

$$\frac{1}{\pi} = 6\,\boldsymbol{i}\,\sum_{k=0}^\infty s_{9A}(k)\,\frac{4-\sqrt{129}\,\left(k+\frac12\right)}{\left( -3\sqrt{3U_{129}}\right)^{k+\frac12}},\quad j_{9A}\left(\frac{3+\sqrt{-43}}{6}\right)=-3\sqrt{3}\left(53\sqrt{3}+14\sqrt{43}\right) = -3\sqrt{3U_{129}}$$

== Level 10 ==
=== Modular functions ===
Define,

$$\begin{align}j_{10A}(\tau) &=\left(\sqrt{j_{10D}(\tau)} - \frac{1}{\sqrt{j_{10D}(\tau)}}\right)^2 = \left(\sqrt{j_{6B}(\tau)} + \frac{4}{\sqrt{j_{10B}(\tau)}}\right)^2 = \left(\sqrt{j_{10C}(\tau)} + \frac{5}{\sqrt{j_{10C}(\tau)}}\right)^2-4  =\frac{1}{q} + 4 + 22q + 56q^2 +\cdots
\end{align}$$

$$\begin{align}j_{10B}(\tau) &= \left(\frac{\eta(\tau)\eta(5\tau)}{\eta(2\tau)\eta(10\tau)}\right)^{4}=\frac{1}{q} - 4 + 6q - 8q^2 + 17q^3 - 32q^4 +\cdots
\end{align}$$

$$\begin{align}j_{10C}(\tau) &= \left(\frac{\eta(\tau)\eta(2\tau)}{\eta(5\tau)\eta(10\tau)}\right)^{2}=\frac{1}{q} - 2 - 3q + 6q^2 + 2q^3 + 2q^4+\cdots\end{align}$$

$$\begin{align}j_{10D}(\tau) &= \left(\frac{\eta(2\tau)\eta(5\tau)}{\eta(\tau)\eta(10\tau)}\right)^{6}=\frac{1}{q} + 6 + 21q + 62q^2 + 162q^3 +\cdots
\end{align}$$

$$\begin{align}j_{10E}(\tau) &= \left(\frac{\eta(2\tau)\eta^5(5\tau)}{\eta(\tau)\eta^5(10\tau)}\right)=\frac{1}{q} + 1 + q + 2q^2 + 2q^3 - 2q^4 +\cdots\end{align}$$

Just like $j_{6A}$, the function $j_{10A}$ is a square or a near-square of the others. Furthermore, there are also linear relations between these,

$$T_{10A}-T_{10B}-T_{10C}-T_{10D}+2T_{10E} = 0$$

or using the above eta quotients j_{n},

$$j_{10A}-j_{10B}-j_{10C}-j_{10D}+2j_{10E} = 6$$

=== β sequences ===
Let,

$\beta_{1}(k)=\sum_{j=0}^k \binom{k}{j}^4 =1, 2, 18, 164, 1810,\ldots$ (OEIS: A005260, labeled as s_{10} in Cooper's paper)

$$\beta_{2}(k)=\binom{2k}{k}\sum_{j=0}^k \binom{2j}{j}^{-1}\binom{k}{j}\sum_{m=0}^j \binom{j}{m}^4 =1, 4, 36, 424, 5716,\ldots$$

$$\beta_{3}(k)=\binom{2k}{k}\sum_{j=0}^k \binom{2j}{j}^{-1}\binom{k}{j} (-4)^{k-j}\sum_{m=0}^j \binom{j}{m}^4 =1, -6, 66, -876, 12786,\ldots$$

their complements,

$$\beta_{2}'(k)=\binom{2k}{k}\sum_{j=0}^k \binom{2j}{j}^{-1}\binom{k}{j} (-1)^{k-j}\sum_{m=0}^j \binom{j}{m}^4 =1, 0, 12, 24, 564, 2784,\ldots$$

$$\beta_{3}'(k)=\binom{2k}{k}\sum_{j=0}^k \binom{2j}{j}^{-1}\binom{k}{j} (4)^{k-j}\sum_{m=0}^j \binom{j}{m}^4 =1, 10, 162, 3124, 66994,\ldots$$

and,

$$s_{10B}(k)=1, -2, 10, -68, 514, -4100, 33940,\ldots$$

$$s_{10C}(k)=1, -1, 1, -1, 1, 23, -263, 1343, -2303,\ldots$$

$$s_{10D}(k)=1, 3, 25, 267, 3249, 42795, 594145,\ldots$$

though closed forms are not yet known for the last three sequences.

=== Identities ===
The modular functions can be related as,

$$U =
\sum_{k=0}^\infty \beta_1(k)\,\frac{1}{\left(j_{10A}(\tau)\right)^{k+\frac12}} =
\sum_{k=0}^\infty \beta_2(k)\,\frac{1}{\left(j_{10A}(\tau)+4\right)^{k+\frac12}} =
\sum_{k=0}^\infty \beta_3(k)\,\frac{1}{\left(j_{10A}(\tau)-16\right)^{k+\frac12}}$$

$$V =
\sum_{k=0}^\infty s_{10B}(k)\,\frac{1}{\left(j_{10B}(\tau)\right)^{k+\frac12}} =
\sum_{k=0}^\infty s_{10C}(k)\,\frac{1}{\left(j_{10C}(\tau)\right)^{k+\frac12}} =
\sum_{k=0}^\infty s_{10D}(k)\,\frac{1}{\left(j_{10D}(\tau)\right)^{k+\frac12}}$$

if the series converges. In fact, it can also be observed that,

$$U = V =\sum_{k=0}^\infty \beta_2'(k)\,\frac{1}{\left(j_{10A}(\tau)-4\right)^{k+\frac12}} =
\sum_{k=0}^\infty \beta_3'(k)\,\frac{1}{\left(j_{10A}(\tau)+16\right)^{k+\frac12}}$$

Since the exponent has a fractional part, the sign of the square root must be chosen appropriately though it is less an issue when j_{n} is positive.

=== Examples ===
Just like level 6, the level 10 function j_{10A} can be used in three ways. Starting with,

$$j_{10A}\left(\sqrt{\frac{-19}{10}}\right) = 76^2 = 5776$$

and noting that $5\cdot19=95$ then,

$$\begin{align}
\frac{1}{\pi} &= \frac{5}{\sqrt{95}}\,\sum_{k=0}^\infty \beta_1(k)\,\frac{408k+47}{\left(76^2\right)^{k+\frac12}}\\
\frac{1}{\pi} &= \frac{1}{17\sqrt{95}}\,\sum_{k=0}^\infty \beta_2(k)\,\frac{19\cdot 1824k+3983}{\left(76^2+4\right)^{k+\frac12}}\\
\frac{1}{\pi} &= \frac{1}{6\sqrt{95}}\,\,\sum_{k=0}^\infty \beta_3(k)\,\,\frac{19\cdot 646k+1427}{\left(76^2-16\right)^{k+\frac12}}\\
\end{align}$$

as well as,

$$\begin{align}
\frac{1}{\pi} &= \frac{5}{481\sqrt{95}}\,\sum_{k=0}^\infty \beta_2'(k)\,\frac{19\cdot 10336k+22675}{\left(76^2-4\right)^{k+\frac12}}\\
\frac{1}{\pi} &= \frac{5}{181\sqrt{95}}\,\sum_{k=0}^\infty \beta_3'(k)\,\frac{19\cdot 3876k+8405}{\left(76^2+16\right)^{k+\frac12}}
\end{align}$$

though the ones using the complements do not yet have a rigorous proof. A conjectured formula using one of the last three sequences is,

$$\frac{1}{\pi} = \frac{\boldsymbol{i}}{\sqrt{5}}\,\sum_{k=0}^\infty s_{10C}(k)\frac{10k+3}{\left(-5^2\right)^{k+\frac12}},\quad j_{10C}\left(\frac{1+\,\boldsymbol{i}}{2}\right) = -5^2$$

which implies there might be examples for all sequences of level 10.

== Level 11 ==
Define the McKay–Thompson series of class 11A,

$$j_{11A}(\tau)= (1+3F)^3+\left(\frac{1}{\sqrt{F}}+3\sqrt{F}\right)^2=\frac{1}{q} + 6 + 17q + 46q^2 + 116q^3 +\cdots$$

or sequence (OEIS: A128525) and where,

$$F = \frac{\eta(3\tau)\,\eta(33\tau)}{\eta(\tau)\,\eta(11\tau)}$$

and,

$s_{11A}(k) = 1, 4, 28, 268, 3004, 36784, 476476,\ldots$ (OEIS: A284756)

No closed form in terms of binomial coefficients is yet known for the sequence but it obeys the recurrence relation,

$$(k + 1)^3 s_{k + 1} = 2(2k + 1)\left(5k^2 + 5k + 2\right)s_k - 8k\left(7k^2 + 1\right)s_{k - 1} + 22k(k - 1)(2k - 1)s_{k - 2}$$

with initial conditions s(0) = 1, s(1) = 4.

Example:

$$\frac{1}{\pi}=\frac{\boldsymbol{i}}{22}\sum_{k=0}^\infty s_{11A}(k)\,\frac{221k+67}{(-44)^{k+\frac12}},\quad j_{11A}\left(\frac{1+\sqrt\frac{-17}{11}}{2}\right)=-44$$

== Higher levels ==
As pointed out by Cooper, there are analogous sequences for certain higher levels.

== Similar series ==
R. Steiner found examples using Catalan numbers $C_k$,

$$\frac{1}{\pi} = \sum_{k=0}^\infty \left(2C_{k-n}\right)^2 \frac{(4z)k+\left(4^{2n-3}-(4n-3)z\right)}{16^k}\qquad z \in \Z,\quad n\ge2,\quad n \in \N$$

and for this a modular form with a second periodic for k exists:

$$k=\frac{(-20-12\boldsymbol{i})+16n}{16},\qquad k=\frac{(-20+12\boldsymbol{i})+16n}{16}$$

Other similar series are

$$\frac{1}{\pi} = \sum_{k=0}^\infty \left(2C_{k-2}\right)^2 \frac{3k+\frac14}{16^k}$$
$$\frac{1}{\pi} = \sum_{k=0}^\infty \left(2C_{k-1}\right)^2 \frac{(4z+1)k-z}{16^k} \qquad z \in \Z$$
$$\frac{1}{\pi} = \sum_{k=0}^\infty \left(2C_{k-1}\right)^2 \frac{-1k+\frac12}{16^k}$$
$$\frac{1}{\pi} = \sum_{k=0}^\infty \left(2C_{k-1}\right)^2 \frac{0k+\frac14}{16^k}$$
$$\frac{1}{\pi} = \sum_{k=0}^\infty \left(2C_{k-1}\right)^2 \frac{{\frac{k}{5}+\frac15}}{16^k}$$
$$\frac{1}{\pi} = \sum_{k=0}^\infty \left(2C_{k-1}\right)^2 \frac{{\frac{k}{3}+\frac16}}{16^k}$$
$$\frac{1}{\pi} = \sum_{k=0}^\infty \left(2C_{k-1}\right)^2 \frac{{\frac{k}{2}+\frac18}}{16^k}$$
$$\frac{1}{\pi} = \sum_{k=0}^\infty \left(2C_{k-1}\right)^2 \frac{2k-\frac14}{16^k}$$
$$\frac{1}{\pi} = \sum_{k=0}^\infty \left(2C_{k-1}\right)^2 \frac{3k-\frac12}{16^k}$$
$$\frac{1}{\pi} = \sum_{k=0}^\infty \left(2C_k\right)^2 \frac{{\frac{k}{16}+\frac{1}{16}}}{16^k}$$

with the last (comments in OEIS: A013709) found by using a linear combination of higher parts of Wallis-Lambert series for $\tfrac{4}{\pi}$ and Euler series for the circumference of an ellipse.

Using the definition of Catalan numbers with the gamma function the first and last for example give the identities

$$\frac14 = \sum_{k=0}^\infty {\left (\frac{\Gamma\left(\frac12+k\right)}{\Gamma(2+k)}\right)}^2 \left(4zk-(4n-3)z+4^{2n-3}\right)\qquad z \in \Z,\quad n\ge2,\quad n \in \N$$

...

$$4 = \sum_{k=0}^\infty {\left (\frac{\Gamma\left(\frac12+k\right)}{\Gamma(2+k)}\right)}^2 (k+1)$$.

The last is also equivalent to,

$$\frac{1}{\pi} = \frac14 \sum_{k=0}^\infty \frac{\binom{2k}{k}^2}{k+1}\, \frac{1}{16^k}$$

and is related to the fact that,

$$\lim_{k \rightarrow \infty} \frac{16^k}{k \binom{2k}{k}^2} = \pi$$

which is a consequence of Stirling's approximation.

== See also ==
- Chudnovsky algorithm
- Borwein's algorithm
