= Chudnovsky algorithm =

Fast method for calculating the digits of π

The Chudnovsky algorithm is a fast method for calculating the digits of π, based on Ramanujan's π formulae. In 1988, it was published by the Chudnovsky brothers, and used to calculate π to a billion decimal places.

It has since been used in the world record calculations of approx. 2.7 trillion digits of π in December 2009, 10 trillion digits in October 2011, around 22.4 trillion digits in November 2016, 31.4 trillion digits in September 2018–January 2019, 50 trillion digits on January 29, 2020, 62.8 trillion digits on August 14, 2021, 100 trillion digits on March 21, 2022, 105 trillion digits on March 14, 2024, and 202 trillion digits on June 28, 2024. Recently, the record was broken yet again on November 18, 2025 with 314 trillion digits of pi. This was done through the usage of the algorithm on y-cruncher.

== Algorithm ==
The algorithm is based on the negated Heegner number $d = -163$, the j-function $j \left(\tfrac{1 + i\sqrt{163}}{2}\right) = -640320^3$, and on the following rapidly convergent generalized hypergeometric series:
$$\frac{1}{\pi} =
\frac{\sqrt{10005}}{4270934400} \sum_{k=0}^{\infty}
{\frac{(-1)^k (6k)! (545140134k + 13591409)}{(3k)! (k!)^3(640320)^{3k}}}$$

This identity is similar to some of Ramanujan's formulas involving π, and is an example of a Ramanujan–Sato series.

The time complexity of the algorithm is $O\left(n (\log n)^3\right)$, where n is the number of digits desired. Each term produces around 14 correct decimal digits of π.

== Optimizations ==
The optimization technique used for the world record computations is called binary splitting.

== See also ==
- Bailey–Borwein–Plouffe formula
- Borwein's algorithm
- Approximations of π
