= Weakly holomorphic modular form =

Mathematical function

In mathematics, a weakly holomorphic modular form is similar to a holomorphic modular form, except that it is allowed to have poles at cusps. Examples include modular functions and modular forms.

== Definition ==
To simplify notation this section does the level 1 case; the extension to higher levels is straightforward.

A level 1 weakly holomorphic modular form is a function f on the upper half plane with the properties:

- f transforms like a modular form: $f((a\tau+b)/(c\tau+d)) = (c\tau+d)^kf(\tau)$ for some integer k called the weight, for any elements of SL_{2}(Z).
- As a function of q=e^{2πiτ}, f is given by a Laurent series whose radius of convergence is 1 (so f is holomorphic on the upper half plane and meromorphic at the cusps).

== Examples ==
The ring of level 1 modular forms is generated by the Eisenstein series E_{4} and E_{6} (which generate the ring of holomorphic modular forms) together with the inverse 1/Δ of the modular discriminant.

Any weakly holomorphic modular form of any level can be written as a quotient of two holomorphic modular forms. However, not every quotient of two holomorphic modular forms is a weakly holomorphic modular form, as it may have poles in the upper half plane.
