= Eugene Salamin (artist) =

Polish-American painter

- Born: 26 April 1912
- Died: 1 April 2009 (aged 96)
- Occupation: Painter

Eugene Salamin (26 April 1912 – 1 April 2009) was a Polish-American painter.

== Early life ==
Born in the Polish region of Galicia in 1912, immigrated to the United States in 1929. He worked a range of temporary jobs during the Great Depression, became committed to Communist Party activism. His serious efforts at artistic painting had already begun during this time.

Talented as a draftsman despite the fact that he had not yet enjoyed any formal training in the painter's craft, he would eventually receive informal art training from the urban scene printmaker Philip Reisman – a relationship which would continue until after the close of World War II. Reismann (1904–1992) was a Polish-born American Jewish who studied at the Art Students League of New York and later participated at the Federal Art Project.

Salamin's artistic leanings during the Depression era also permitted some work as an artist for the Works Progress Administration. Its end during the war years meant that social realism was now officially disfavored: canvases were thrown away and even burned according to the dictates of the United States government.

Among socially minded artists, self-censorship emerged as a response to the "patriotic" requirements as a compromise during the period of World War II. A leftist who supported the war as a struggle against fascism in Europe, Salamin would return to his politically minded art following the war, only to be caught up in an unprecedented wave of anti-communism during the Second Red Scare period.

== Controversies ==
Still obscure, Salamin was faced with political persecution against himself as a communist after the passage of the anti-communist provisions of the 1947 Taft-Hartley Act and his efforts at organizing machinists in the Brooklyn Navy Yard during the 1940s invited political persecution from the American government. Salamin's work in the garment industry, immune to some of the attacks against communist activists in various other spheres of American industry, afforded a measure of protection from the country's creeping McCarthyism.

As a mode of political expression, his art conflicted with American mores of the 1950s, and he would become an "underground artist" while working a day job at a clothing store sweatshop in New York City's Brooklyn borough and the Upper West Side neighborhood, depicting the "dystopian sweatshop" works for which his career has been most recognized.

Retiring from manual work in New York in 1973, he described the "wonderful feeling" of being able to emerge as an artist working full-time.

Salamin continued working into the 2000s (decade) and donated 25 of his works to the Communist Party's reference center in the 1990s. He settled in California during his last years.

== Personal life ==
Salamin died on April 1, 2009, nearly 97 years of age.
