= Eugene Salamin (mathematician) =

American mathematician

Eugene Salamin is a mathematician who discovered (independently with Richard Brent) the Salamin–Brent algorithm, used in high-precision calculation of pi.

Eugene Salamin worked on alternatives to increase accuracy and minimize computational processes through the use of quaternions. Benefits may include:

1. the design of spatio-temporal databases;
2. numerical mathematical methods that traditionally prove unsuccessful due to the buildup of computational errors;
3. therefore, may be applied to applications involving genetic algorithms and evolutionary computation, in general.

== Publications ==
Eugene Salamin (1976). "Computation of $\pi$ Using Arithmetic-Geometric Mean". Mathematics of Computation. 30 (135): 565–570. JSTOR 2005327.

== See also ==
- HAKMEM
