= Richard P. Brent =

Australian mathematician and computer scientist

Richard Peirce Brent
- Education: Stanford University
- Awards: Hannan Medal (2005)
- Scientific career
- Fields: Mathematics, computer science
- Workplaces: Australian National University
- Doctoral advisors: Gene H. Golub; George Forsythe

Richard Peirce Brent is an Australian mathematician and computer scientist. He is an emeritus professor at the Australian National University. From March 2005 to March 2010 he was a Federation Fellow at the Australian National University. His research interests include number theory (in particular factorisation), random number generators, computer architecture, and analysis of algorithms.

In 1973, he published a root-finding algorithm (an algorithm for solving equations numerically) which is now known as Brent's method.

In 1975 he and Eugene Salamin independently conceived the Salamin–Brent algorithm, used in high-precision calculation of $\pi$. At the same time, he showed that all the elementary functions (such as log(x), sin(x) etc.) can be evaluated to high precision in the same time as $\pi$ (apart from a small constant factor) using the arithmetic-geometric mean of Carl Friedrich Gauss.

In 1979 he showed that the first 75 million complex zeros of the Riemann zeta function lie on the critical line, providing some experimental evidence for the Riemann hypothesis.

In 1980 he and Nobel laureate Edwin McMillan found a new algorithm for high-precision computation of the Euler–Mascheroni constant $\gamma$ using Bessel functions, and showed that $\gamma$ can not have a simple rational form p/q (where p and q are integers) unless q is extremely large (greater than 10^{15000}).

In 1980 he and John Pollard factored the eighth Fermat number using a variant of the Pollard rho algorithm. He later factored the tenth and eleventh Fermat numbers using Lenstra's elliptic curve factorisation algorithm.

In 2002, Brent, Samuli Larvala and Paul Zimmermann discovered a very large primitive trinomial over GF(2):

$$x^{6972593} + x^{3037958} + 1.$$

The degree 6972593 is the exponent of a Mersenne prime.

In 2009 and 2016, Brent and Paul Zimmermann discovered some even larger primitive trinomials, for example:

$$x^{43112609} + x^{3569337} + 1.$$

The degree 43112609 is again the exponent of a Mersenne prime. The highest degree trinomials found were three trinomials of degree 74,207,281, also a Mersenne prime exponent.

In 2011, Brent and Paul Zimmermann published Modern Computer Arithmetic (Cambridge University Press), a book about algorithms for performing arithmetic, and their implementation on modern computers.

Brent is a Fellow of the Association for Computing Machinery, the IEEE, SIAM and the Australian Academy of Science. In 2005, he was awarded the Hannan Medal by the Australian Academy of Science. In 2014, he was awarded the Moyal Medal by Macquarie University.

== See also ==
- Brent–Kung adder
