= Borwein's algorithm =

Method for calculating the value of pi

Borwein's algorithm was devised by Jonathan and Peter Borwein to calculate the value of $1 / \pi$. This and other algorithms can be found in the book Pi and the AGM – A Study in Analytic Number Theory and Computational Complexity.

== Ramanujan–Sato series ==
These two are examples of a Ramanujan–Sato series. The related Chudnovsky algorithm uses a discriminant with class number 1.

=== Class number 2 (1989) ===
Start by setting

$$\begin{align} A & = 212175710912 \sqrt{61} + 1657145277365 \\
B & = 13773980892672 \sqrt{61} + 107578229802750 \\
C & = \left(5280\left(236674+30303\sqrt{61}\right)\right)^3
\end{align}$$

Then

$$\frac{1}{\pi} = 12\sum_{n=0}^\infty \frac{ (-1)^n (6n)!\, (A+nB) }{(n!)^3(3n)!\, C^{n+\frac12}}$$

Each additional term of the partial sum yields approximately 25 digits.

=== Class number 4 (1993) ===
Start by setting

$$\begin{align}
A = {} & 63365028312971999585426220 \\
& {} + 28337702140800842046825600\sqrt{5} \\
& {} + 384\sqrt{5} \big(10891728551171178200467436212395209160385656017 \\
& {} + \left. 4870929086578810225077338534541688721351255040\sqrt{5}\right)^\frac12 \\
B = {} & 7849910453496627210289749000 \\
& {} + 3510586678260932028965606400\sqrt{5} \\
& {} + 2515968\sqrt{3110}\big(6260208323789001636993322654444020882161 \\
& {} + \left. 2799650273060444296577206890718825190235\sqrt{5}\right)^\frac12 \\
C = {} & -214772995063512240 \\
& {} - 96049403338648032\sqrt{5} \\
& {} - 1296\sqrt{5}\big(10985234579463550323713318473 \\
& {} + \left. 4912746253692362754607395912\sqrt{5}\right)^\frac12
\end{align}$$

Then

$$\frac{\sqrt{-C^3}}{\pi} = \sum_{n=0}^{\infty} {\frac{(6n)!}{(3n)!(n!)^3} \frac{A+nB}{C^{3n}}}$$

Each additional term of the series yields approximately 50 digits.

== Iterative algorithms ==
=== Quadratic convergence (1984) ===
Start by setting

$$\begin{align} a_0 & = \sqrt{2} \\
b_0 & = 0 \\
p_0 & = 2 + \sqrt{2}
\end{align}$$

Then iterate

$$\begin{align} a_{n+1} & = \frac{\sqrt{a_n} + \frac{1}\sqrt{a_n}}{2} \\
b_{n+1} & = \frac{(1 + b_n) \sqrt{a_n}}{a_n + b_n} \\
p_{n+1} & = \frac{(1 + a_{n+1})\, p_n b_{n+1}}{1 + b_{n+1}}
\end{align}$$

Then p_{k} converges quadratically to π; that is, each iteration approximately doubles the number of correct digits. The algorithm is not self-correcting; each iteration must be performed with the desired number of correct digits for π's final result.

=== Cubic convergence (1991) ===
Start by setting

$$\begin{align} a_0 & = \frac13 \\
s_0 & = \frac{\sqrt{3} - 1}{2}
\end{align}$$

Then iterate

$$\begin{align} r_{k+1} & = \frac{3}{1 + 2\left(1-s_k^3\right)^\frac13} \\
s_{k+1} & = \frac{r_{k+1} - 1}{2} \\
a_{k+1} & = r_{k+1}^2 a_k - 3^k\left(r_{k+1}^2-1\right)
\end{align}$$

Then a_{k} converges cubically to 1/π; that is, each iteration approximately triples the number of correct digits.

=== Quartic convergence (1985) ===
Start by setting

$$\begin{align} a_0 & = 2\left(\sqrt{2}-1\right)^2 \\
y_0 & = \sqrt{2}-1
\end{align}$$

Then iterate

$$\begin{align} y_{k+1} & = \frac{1-\left(1-y_k^4\right)^\frac14}{1+\left(1-y_k^4\right)^\frac14} \\
a_{k+1} & = a_k\left(1+y_{k+1}\right)^4 - 2^{2k+3} y_{k+1} \left(1 + y_{k+1} + y_{k+1}^2\right)
\end{align}$$

Then a_{k} converges quartically against 1/π; that is, each iteration approximately quadruples the number of correct digits. The algorithm is not self-correcting; each iteration must be performed with the desired number of correct digits for π's final result.

One iteration of this algorithm is equivalent to two iterations of the Gauss–Legendre algorithm. A proof of these algorithms can be found here:

=== Quintic convergence ===
Start by setting

$$\begin{align} a_0 & = \frac12 \\
s_0 & = 5\left(\sqrt{5} - 2\right) = \frac{5}{\phi^3}
\end{align}$$

where $\phi = \tfrac{1+\sqrt5}{2}$ is the golden ratio. Then iterate

$$\begin{align} x_{n+1} & = \frac{5}{s_n} - 1 \\
y_{n+1} & = \left(x_{n+1} - 1\right)^2 + 7 \\
z_{n+1} & = \left(\frac12 x_{n+1}\left(y_{n+1} + \sqrt{y_{n+1}^2 - 4x_{n+1}^3}\right)\right)^\frac15 \\
a_{n+1} & = s_n^2 a_n - 5^n\left(\frac{s_n^2 - 5}{2} + \sqrt{s_n\left(s_n^2 - 2s_n + 5\right)}\right) \\
s_{n+1} & = \frac{25}{\left(z_{n+1} + \frac{x_{n+1}}{z_{n+1}} + 1\right)^2 s_n}
\end{align}$$

Then a_{k} converges quintically to 1/π (that is, each iteration approximately quintuples the number of correct digits), and the following condition holds:

$$0 < a_n - \frac{1}{\pi} < 16\cdot 5^n\cdot e^{-5^n}\pi\,\!$$

=== Nonic convergence ===
Start by setting

$$\begin{align} a_0 & = \frac13 \\
r_0 & = \frac{\sqrt{3} - 1}{2} \\
s_0 & = \left(1 - r_0^3\right)^\frac13
\end{align}$$

Then iterate

$$\begin{align} t_{n+1} & = 1 + 2r_n \\
u_{n+1} & = \left(9r_n \left(1 + r_n + r_n^2\right)\right)^\frac13 \\
v_{n+1} & = t_{n+1}^2 + t_{n+1}u_{n+1} + u_{n+1}^2 \\
w_{n+1} & = \frac{27 \left(1 + s_n + s_n^2\right)}{v_{n+1}} \\
a_{n+1} & = w_{n+1}a_n + 3^{2n-1}\left(1-w_{n+1}\right) \\
s_{n+1} & = \frac{\left(1 - r_n\right)^3}{\left(t_{n+1} + 2u_{n+1}\right)v_{n+1}} \\
r_{n+1} & = \left(1 - s_{n+1}^3\right)^\frac13
\end{align}$$

Then a_{k} converges nonically to 1/π; that is, each iteration approximately multiplies the number of correct digits by nine.

== See also ==
- Bailey–Borwein–Plouffe formula
- Chudnovsky algorithm
- Gauss–Legendre algorithm
- Ramanujan–Sato series
