= Arithmetic–geometric mean =

Mathematical function of two positive real arguments

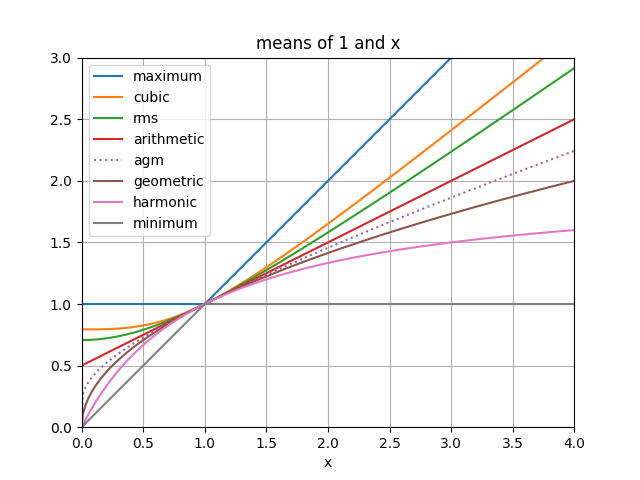
Plot of the arithmetic–geometric mean $\operatorname{agm}(1,x)$ among several generalized means.

In mathematics, the arithmetic–geometric mean (AGM or agM) of two positive real numbers x and y is the mutual limit of a sequence of arithmetic means and a sequence of geometric means. The arithmetic–geometric mean is used in fast algorithms for exponential, trigonometric functions, and other special functions, as well as some mathematical constants, in particular, computing π.

The AGM is defined as the limit of the interdependent sequences $a_i$ and $g_i$. Assuming $x \geq y \geq 0$, we write:
$$\begin{align}
a_0 &= x,\\
g_0 &= y\\
a_{n+1} &= \tfrac12(a_n + g_n),\\
g_{n+1} &= \sqrt{a_n g_n}\, .
\end{align}$$
These two sequences converge to the same number, the arithmetic–geometric mean of x and y; it is denoted by M(x, y), or sometimes by agm(x, y) or AGM(x, y).

The arithmetic–geometric mean can be extended to complex numbers and, when the branches of the square root are allowed to be taken inconsistently, it is a multivalued function.

== Example ==
To find the arithmetic–geometric mean of a_{0} = 24 and g_{0} = 6, iterate as follows:
$$\begin{array}{rcccl}
a_1 & = & \tfrac12(24 + 6) & = & 15\\
g_1 & = & \sqrt{24 \cdot 6} & = & 12\\
a_2 & = & \tfrac12(15 + 12) & = & 13.5\\
g_2 & = & \sqrt{15 \cdot 12} & = & 13.416\ 407\ 8649\dots\\
& & \vdots & &
\end{array}$$
The first five iterations give the following values:

n	a_{n}	g_{n}
0	24	6
1	15	12
2	13.5	13.416 407 864 998 738 178 455 042...
3	13.458 203 932 499 369 089 227 521...	13.458 139 030 990 984 877 207 090...
4	13.458 171 481 745 176 983 217 305...	13.458 171 481 706 053 858 316 334...
5	13.458 171 481 725 615 420 766 820...	13.458 171 481 725 615 420 766 806...

The number of digits in which a_{n} and g_{n} agree (underlined) approximately doubles with each iteration. The arithmetic–geometric mean of 24 and 6 is the common limit of these two sequences, which is approximately 13.4581714817256154207668131569743992430538388544.

== History ==
The first algorithm based on this sequence pair appeared in the works of Joseph-Louis Lagrange. Its properties were further analyzed by Carl Friedrich Gauss.

== Properties ==
Both the geometric mean and arithmetic mean of two positive numbers x and y are between the two numbers. (They are strictly between when x ≠ y.) The geometric mean of two positive numbers is never greater than the arithmetic mean. So the geometric means are an increasing sequence g_{0} ≤ g_{1} ≤ g_{2} ≤ ...; the arithmetic means are a decreasing sequence a_{0} ≥ a_{1} ≥ a_{2} ≥ ...; and g_{n} ≤ M(x, y) ≤ a_{n} for any n. These are strict inequalities if x ≠ y.

M(x, y) is thus a number between x and y; it is also between the geometric and arithmetic mean of x and y.

If r ≥ 0 then M(rx, ry) = r M(x, y).

There is an integral-form expression for M(x, y):
$$\begin{align}
M(x,y) &= \frac{\pi}{2} \left( \int_0^\frac{\pi}{2}\frac{d\theta}{\sqrt{x^2\cos^2\theta+y^2\sin^2\theta}} \right)^{-1}\\
&=\pi\left(\int_0^\infty \frac{dt}{\sqrt{t(t+x^2)(t+y^2)}}\right)^{-1}\\
&= \frac{\pi}{4} \cdot \frac{x + y}{K\left( \frac{x - y}{x + y} \right)}
\end{align}$$
where K(k) is the complete elliptic integral of the first kind:
$$K(k) = \int_0^\frac{\pi}{2}\frac{d\theta}{\sqrt{1 - k^2\sin^2\theta}}$$
Since the arithmetic–geometric process converges so quickly, it provides an efficient way to compute elliptic integrals, which are used, for example, in elliptic filter design.

The arithmetic–geometric mean is connected to the Jacobi theta function $\theta_3$ by
$$\begin{align}
M(1,x) &= \theta_3^{-2}{\left(\exp \left(-\pi \frac{M(1,x)}{M\left(1,\sqrt{1-x^2}\right)}\right)\right)} \\
&= \left[\sum_{n\in\mathbb{Z}}\exp \left(-n^2 \pi \frac{M(1,x)}{M\left(1,\sqrt{1-x^2}\right)}\right)\right]^{-2},
\end{align}$$
which upon setting $x=1/\sqrt{2}$ gives
$$M(1,1/\sqrt{2})=\left(\sum_{n\in\mathbb{Z}}e^{-n^2\pi}\right)^{-2}.$$

== Related concepts ==
The reciprocal of the arithmetic–geometric mean of 1 and the square root of 2 is Gauss's constant.
$$\frac{1}{M(1, \sqrt{2})} = G = 0.8346268\dots$$
In 1799, Gauss proved (Note: By 1799, Gauss had two proofs of the theorem, but neither of them was rigorous from the modern point of view.) that
$$M(1,\sqrt{2})=\frac{\pi}{\varpi}$$
where $\varpi$ is the lemniscate constant.

In 1941, $M(1,\sqrt{2})$ (and hence $G$) was proved transcendental by Theodor Schneider. (Note: In particular, he proved that the beta function $\Beta (a,b)$ is transcendental for all $a,b\in\mathbb{Q}\setminus\mathbb{Z}$ such that $a+b\notin \mathbb{Z}_0^-$. The fact that $M(1,\sqrt{2})$ is transcendental follows from $M(1,\sqrt{2})=\tfrac{1}{2}\Beta \left(\tfrac{1}{2},\tfrac{3}{4}\right).$) The set $\{\pi,M(1,1/\sqrt{2})\}$ is algebraically independent over $\mathbb{Q}$, but the set $\{\pi,M(1,1/\sqrt{2}),M'(1,1/\sqrt{2})\}$ (where the prime denotes the derivative with respect to the second variable) is not algebraically independent over $\mathbb{Q}$. In fact,
$$\pi=2\sqrt{2}\frac{M^3(1,1/\sqrt{2})}{M'(1,1/\sqrt{2})}.$$
The geometric–harmonic mean GH can be calculated using analogous sequences of geometric and harmonic means, and in fact GH(x, y) = 1/M(1/x, 1/y) = xy/M(x, y). The arithmetic–harmonic mean is equivalent to the geometric mean.

The arithmetic–geometric mean can be used to compute – among others – logarithms, complete and incomplete elliptic integrals of the first and second kind, and Jacobi elliptic functions.

== Proof of existence ==
The inequality of arithmetic and geometric means implies that
$$g_n \leq a_n$$
and thus
$$g_{n + 1} = \sqrt{g_n \cdot a_n} \geq \sqrt{g_n \cdot g_n} = g_n$$
that is, the sequence g_{n} is nondecreasing and bounded above by the larger of x and y. By the monotone convergence theorem, the sequence is convergent, so there exists a g such that:
$$\lim_{n\to \infty}g_n = g$$
However, we can also see that:
$$a_n = \frac{g_{n + 1}^2}{g_n}$$
and so:
$$\lim_{n\to \infty}a_n = \lim_{n\to \infty}\frac{g_{n + 1}^2}{g_{n}} = \frac{g^2}{g} = g$$

Q.E.D.

== Proof of the integral-form expression ==
This proof is given by Gauss. Let

$$I(x,y) = \int_0^{\pi/2}\frac{d\theta}{\sqrt{x^2\cos^2\theta+y^2\sin^2\theta}} ,$$

Changing the variable of integration to $\theta'$, where

$$\begin{align}
\sin\theta &= \frac{2x\sin\theta'}{(x+y)+(x-y)\sin^2\theta'} \\
\Rightarrow d(\sin\theta) &= d\left(\frac{2x\sin\theta'}{(x+y)+(x-y)\sin^2\theta'}\right)\\
\Rightarrow \cos\theta\ d\theta &= 2x  \frac{(x+y)-(x-y)\sin^2\theta'}{((x+y)+(x-y)\sin^2\theta')^2}\ \cos\theta' d\theta'
\end{align}$$

$$\begin{align}
\cos\theta
&= \frac{\sqrt{(x+y)^2-2(x^2+y^2)\sin^2\theta'+(x-y)^2\sin^4\theta'}}{(x+y) + (x-y)\sin^2\theta'}\\[1ex]
&= \frac{\cos\theta'\sqrt{(x-y)^2\cos^2\theta'+4xy}}{(x+y)+(x-y)\sin^2\theta'}\\[1ex]
&= \frac{\cos\theta'\sqrt{(x+y)^2\cos^2\theta'+4xy\sin^2\theta'}}{(x+y)+(x-y)\sin^2\theta'},
\end{align}$$

$$\begin{align}
\Rightarrow
\cos\theta\ d\theta &=\frac{\cos\theta'\sqrt{(x+y)^2\cos^2\theta'+4xy\sin^2\theta'}}{(x+y)+(x-y)\sin^2\theta'}\ d\theta \\[1ex]
&= 2x  \frac{(x+y)-(x-y)\sin^2\theta'}{((x+y)+(x-y)\sin^2\theta')^2}\ \cos\theta' d\theta' ,
\end{align}$$

$$\Rightarrow
d\theta = \frac{x((x+y)-(x-y)\sin^2\theta')}{((x+y)+(x-y)\sin^2\theta')} \frac{2 d\theta'}{\sqrt{(x+y)^2\cos^2\theta'+4xy\sin^2\theta'}}
\ ,$$

$$\begin{align}
\sqrt{x^2\cos^2\theta+y^2\sin^2\theta}
&= \frac{\sqrt{{x^2 \left[(x+y)^2-2(x^2+y^2)\sin^2\theta'+(x-y)^2\sin^4\theta'\right] + 4x^2y^2\sin^2\theta'}}}{((x+y)+(x-y)\sin^2\theta')}\\
&= \frac{x \left((x+y)-(x-y)\sin^2\theta'\right)}{\left((x+y)+(x-y)\sin^2\theta'\right)}
\end{align}$$

This yields
$$\begin{align}
\frac{d\theta}{\sqrt{x^2\cos^2\theta+y^2\sin^2\theta}} &= \frac{2 d\theta'}{\sqrt{(x+y)^2\cos^2\theta'+4xy\sin^2\theta'}} \\
&= \frac{d\theta'}{\sqrt{\left(\frac{x+y}{2}\right)^2\cos^2\theta' + \left(\sqrt{xy}\right)^2\sin^2\theta'}},
\end{align}$$

gives

$$\begin{align}
I(x,y) &= \int_0^{\pi/2}\frac{d\theta'}{\sqrt{\left(\frac{x+y}{2}\right)^2\cos^2\theta' + \left(\sqrt{xy}\right)^2 \sin^2\theta'}} \\
&= I{\left(\tfrac{x+y}{2},\sqrt{xy}\right)} .
\end{align}$$

Thus, we have

$$\begin{align}
I(x,y) &= I(a_1, g_1) = I(a_2, g_2) = \cdots\\
&= I\bigl(M(x,y),M(x,y)\bigr) = \frac{\pi}{2M(x,y)} .
\end{align}$$
The last equality comes from observing that $I(z,z) = \pi/(2z)$.

Finally, we obtain the desired result

$$M(x,y) = \frac{\pi}{2 I(x,y)}.$$

== Applications ==
=== The number π ===
According to the Gauss–Legendre algorithm,

$$\pi = \frac{4\,M(1,1/\sqrt{2})^2} {1 - \displaystyle\sum_{j=1}^\infty 2^{j+1} c_j^2} ,$$

where

$$c_j = \frac{1}{2}\left(a_{j-1}-g_{j-1}\right) ,$$

with $a_0=1$ and $g_0=1/\sqrt{2}$, which can be computed without loss of precision using

$$c_j = \frac{c_{j-1}^2}{4a_j} .$$

=== Complete elliptic integral K(sinα) ===
Taking $a_0 = 1$ and $g_0 = \cos\alpha$ yields the AGM

$$M(1,\cos\alpha) = \frac{\pi}{2K(\sin \alpha)} ,$$

where K(k) is a complete elliptic integral of the first kind:

$$K(k) = \int_0^{\pi/2} \frac{d\theta}{\sqrt{1 - k^2 \sin^2\theta}}.$$

That is to say that this quarter period may be efficiently computed through the AGM,
$$K(k) =  \frac{\pi}{2M(1,\sqrt{1-k^2})} .$$

=== Other applications ===
Using this property of the AGM along with the ascending transformations of John Landen, Richard P. Brent suggested the first AGM algorithms for the fast evaluation of elementary transcendental functions (e^{x}, cos x, sin x). Subsequently, many authors went on to study the use of the AGM algorithms.

== See also ==
- Gauss–Legendre algorithm
- Generalized mean
- Landen's transformation
