= William Shanks =

Amateur mathematician and school owner (1812–1882)

- Born: 25 January 1812; Corsenside, Northumberland, England
- Died: June 1882 (aged 70); Houghton-le-Spring, County Durham, England
- Known for: Calculating π to 707 decimal places
- Scientific career
- Fields: Mathematics
- Workplaces: Boarding school at Houghton-le-Spring

William Shanks (/ˈʃæŋks/; 25 January 1812 – June 1882) was an English amateur mathematician. He is famous for his calculation of π to 707 decimal places in 1873, which was correct up to the first 527 places. The error was discovered in 1944 by D. F. Ferguson (using a mechanical desk calculator). Nevertheless, Shanks's approximation was the longest expansion of π until the advent of the digital electronic computer in the 1940s.

== Biography ==
Shanks was born in 1812 in Corsenside. He may have been a student of William Rutherford as a young boy in the 1820s, and he dedicated a book on π published in 1853 to Rutherford. After his marriage in 1846, Shanks earned his living by owning a boarding school at Houghton-le-Spring, which left him enough time to spend on his hobby of calculating mathematical constants.

In addition to calculating π, Shanks also calculated e and the Euler–Mascheroni constant γ to many decimal places. He published a table of primes (and the periods of their reciprocals) up to 110,000 and found the natural logarithms of 2, 3, 5 and 10 to 137 places. During his calculations, which took many tedious days of work, Shanks was said to have calculated new digits all morning and would then spend all afternoon checking his morning's work.

Shanks died in Houghton-le-Spring, County Durham, England, in June 1882, aged 70, and was buried at the local Hillside Cemetery on 17 June 1882.

== Calculations of pi ==
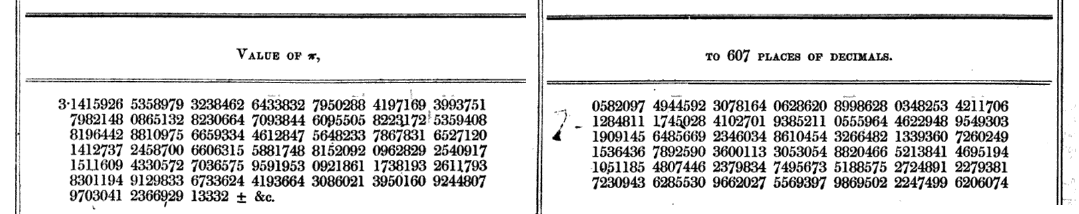
Shanks' approximation to π, published in 1853

To calculate π, Shanks used Machin's formula:

$$\frac{\pi}{4} = 4 \arctan \left(\frac{1}{5} \right) - \arctan \left(\frac{1}{239} \right)$$

Shanks calculated π to 530 decimal places in January 1853, of which the first 527 were correct (the last few likely being incorrect because of round-off errors). He subsequently expanded his calculation to 607 decimal places in April 1853, but an error introduced at the start of the new calculation, right at the 530th decimal place where his previous calculation ended, rendered the rest of his calculation erroneous. Given the nature of Machin's formula, the error propagated back to the 528th decimal place, leaving only the first 527 digits correct once again. In April 1873, twenty years later, Shanks expanded his calculation to 707 decimal places. Because this was an expansion of his previous calculation, all of the new digits were incorrect as well.

The approximation in the image reads as follows (marking incorrect digits with strikethrough):

3.	1415926 5358979 3238462 6433832 7950288 4197169 3993751 0582097 4944592 3078164 0628620 8998628 0348253 4211706 7982148 0865132 8230664 7093844 6095505 8223172 5359408 1284811 1745028 4102701 9385211 0555964 4622948 9549303 8196442 8810975 6659334 4612847 5648233 7867831 6527120 1909145 6485669 2346034 8610454 3266482 1339360 7260249 1412737 2458700 6606315 5881748 8152092 0962829 2540917 1536436 7892590 3600113 3053054 8820466 5213841 4695194 1511609 4330572 7036575 9591953 0921861 1738193 2611793 1051185 4807446 2379~~834~~ 7495673 5188575 2724891 2279381 8301194 9129833 6733624 4~~193~~664 3086021 39~~50160 9244807 7230943 6285530 9662027 5569397 9869502 2247499 6206074 9703041 2366929 13332~~

== See also ==
- Chronology of computation of π
- History of π
