= William Rutherford (mathematician) =

English mathematician (1798–1871)

William Rutherford (1798–1871) was an English mathematician famous for his calculation of 208 digits of the mathematical constant π in 1841.

Only the first 152 calculated digits were later found to be correct; but that broke the record of the time, which was held by the Slovenian mathematician Jurij Vega since 1789 (126 first digits correct). Rutherford used the following formula:

$${\pi\over 4} = 4 \arctan \left({1\over 5}\right) - \arctan \left({1\over 70}\right) + \arctan \left({1\over 99}\right)$$

== Life ==
Rutherford was born about 1798. He was a master at a school at Woodburn from 1822 to 1825, when he went to Hawick, Roxburghshire, and he was later (1832–1837) a master at Corporation Academy, Berwick-on-Tweed.

In 1838 Rutherford obtained a mathematical post at the Royal Military Academy, Woolwich. He was a member of the council of the Royal Astronomical Society from 1844 to 1847, and honorary secretary in 1845 and 1846. He was a friend of Wesley S. B. Woolhouse.

Rutherford retired from his post at Woolwich about 1864, and died on 16 September 1871, at his residence, Tweed Cottage, Maryon Road, Charlton, at the age of seventy-three.

== Works ==
Rutherford was the editor, with Stephen Fenwick and (for the first volume only) with Thomas Stephen Davies, of The Mathematician, vol. i. 1845, vol. ii. 1847, vol. iii. 1850, to which he contributed many papers. He sent problems, solutions and papers to The Ladies' Diary from 1822 to 1869, and also contributed to the Gentlemen's Diary. His mathematical studies were of a traditional type.

Rutherford edited

- Simson's Euclid (1841, 1847);
- Charles Hutton's Course of Mathematics, for Woolwich, 1841, 1846, 1854, 1860;
- John Bonnycastle's Algebra, with William Galbraith, 1848;
- Thomas Carpenter's Arithmetic, 1852, 1859;
- Edwin Colman Tyson's Key to Bonnycastle's Arithmetic, 1860;

He published also:

- Computation of π to 208 Decimal Places (correct to 153), Philosophical Transactions, 1841.
- Demonstration of Pascal's Theorem, Philosophical Magazine, 1843.
- Theorems in Co-ordinate Geometry, Philosophical Magazine, 1843.
- Elementary Propositions in the Geometry of Co-ordinates (with Stephen Fenwick), 1843.
- Earthwork Tables (with Charles K. Sibley), 1847.
- Complete Solution of Numerical Equations , 1849.
- Arithmetic, Algebra, and Differential and Integral Calculus in Course of Mathematics for R.M.A. Woolwich , 1850.
- The Extension of π to 440 Places (Royal Society Proceedings, 1853, p. 274).
- On Statical Friction and Revetments , 1859.

He also wrote mathematical pamphlets, including one on the solution of spherical triangles.

== See also ==
- History of π
- History of numerical approximations of π
- Napoleon's theorem
- Yasumasa Kanada

== References and notes ==
Attribution

This article incorporates text from a publication now in the public domain: "Rutherford, William". Dictionary of National Biography. London: Smith, Elder & Co. 1885–1900.
