= William Galbraith (mathematician) =

Scottish mathematician

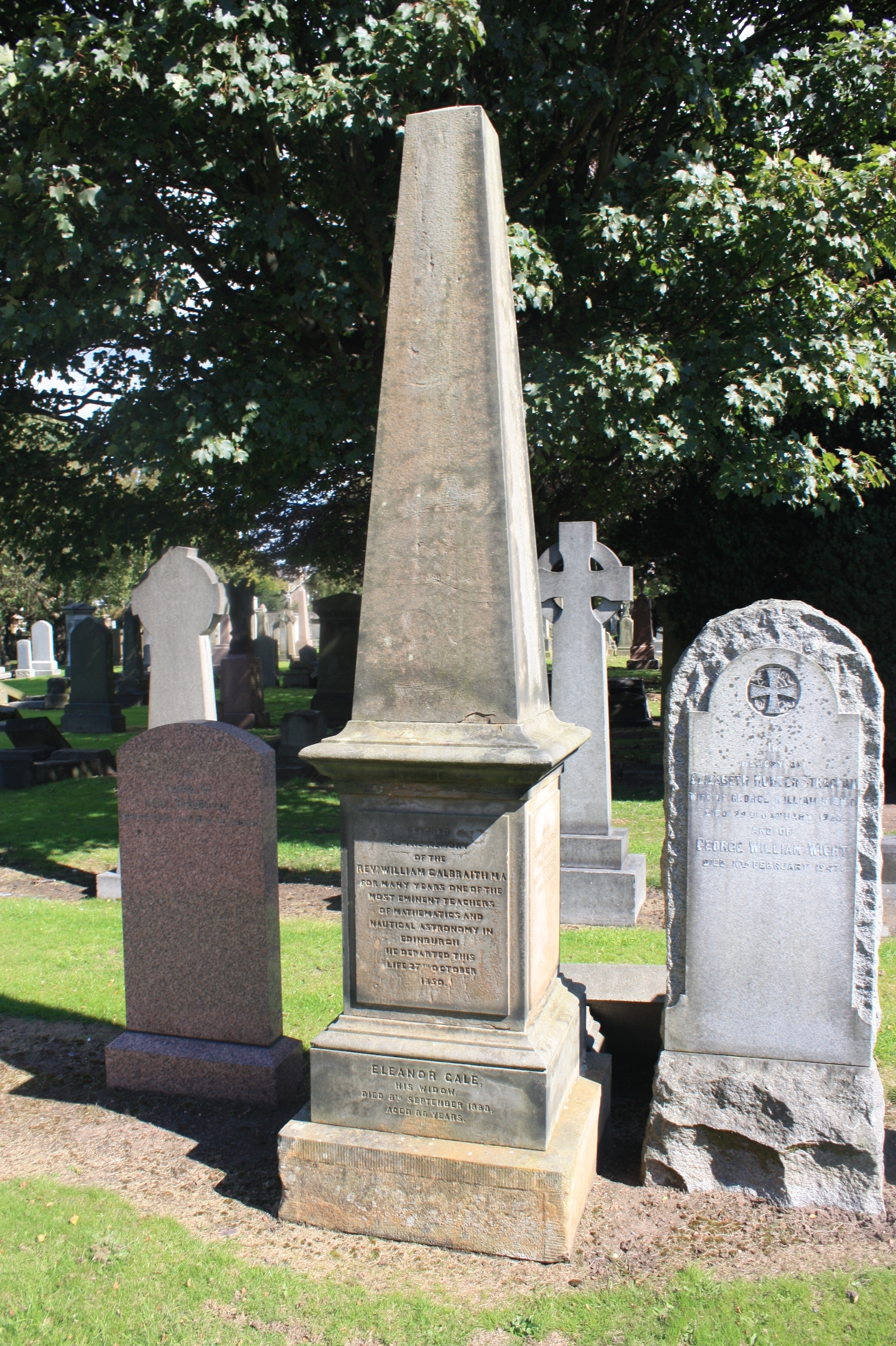
William Galbraith's grave, Grange Cemetery

Rev William Galbraith (1786 – 27 October 1850) was a Scottish mathematician. He taught mathematics and nautical astronomy in Edinburgh, and took an interest in surveying work, becoming an advocate of the extension of the work of triangulating Great Britain.

== Early life ==
He was born at Greenlaw, Berwickshire. Initially he was a schoolmaster. His pupil William Rutherford walked long distances to attend his school at Eccles. Subsequently, he moved to Edinburgh, and graduated A.M. at the University of Edinburgh in 1821.

== Surveyor ==
During the 1830s Galbraith became interested in the surveying problems of Scotland. In 1831 he pointed out that Arthur's Seat had a strongly magnetic peak. In 1837 he pointed out the impact of anomalies in measurement, work that received recognition; it was topical because of the 1836 geological map of Scotland by John MacCulloch, with which critics had found fault on topographical as well as geological grounds. A paper on the locations of places on the River Clyde was recognised in 1837 by a gold medal, from the Society for the Encouragement of the Useful Arts for Scotland.

Galbraith followed with detailed Remarks on the Geographical Position of some Points on the West Coast of Scotland (1838). Having made some accurate surveys of his own, he lobbied for further attention from the national survey.

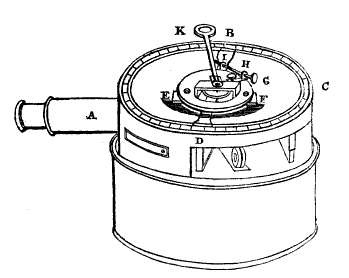
Galbraith's pocket-box circle, an invention for portable surveying.

== Later life ==
About 1832 Galbraith was licensed a minister by the presbytery of Dunse. He married Eleanor Gale in 1833.

Galbraith was buried with his wife in the north-east section of the Grange Cemetery in Edinburgh.

== Works ==
Galbraith's major works combined textbook material with mathematical tables:

- Mathematical and Astronomical Tables (1827): review.
- Trigonometrical Surveying, Levelling, and Railway Engineering (1842)

He edited John Ainslie's 1812 treatise on land surveying (1849), and with William Rutherford revised John Bonnycastle's Algebra.
