= Fabrice Bellard =

French computer programmer (born 1972)

- Born: June 17, 1972 (age 54); Grenoble, France
- Education: École Polytechnique
- Occupations: Co-founder and CTO, Amarisoft
- Known for: QEMU, FFmpeg, Tiny C Compiler, Bellard's formula
- Website: bellard.org

Fabrice Bellard (French pronunciation: [fa.bʁis bɛ.laʁ]; born 1972) is a French computer programmer known for writing FFmpeg, QEMU, and the Tiny C Compiler. He developed Bellard's formula for calculating single digits of pi. In 2012, Bellard co-founded Amarisoft, a telecommunications company, with Franck Spinelli.

== Life and career ==
Bellard was born in 1972 in Grenoble, France and went to school in Lycée Joffre (Montpellier), where, at age 17, he created the executable compressor LZEXE. After studying at École Polytechnique, he went on to specialize at Télécom Paris in 1996.

In 1997, he discovered a new, faster formula to calculate single digits of pi in hexadecimal representation, known as Bellard's formula. It is a variant of the Bailey–Borwein–Plouffe formula.

Bellard's entries won the International Obfuscated C Code Contest three times. In 2000, he won in the category "Most Specific Output" for a program that implemented the modular fast Fourier transform and used it to compute the then biggest known prime number, 2^{6972593}−1 (in the sense that it prints the decimal representation of this number, which itself is assumed to be known). In 2001, he won in the category "Best Abuse of the Rules" for a tiny compiler (the source code being only 3 kB in size) of a strict subset of the C language for i386 Linux. The program itself is written in this language subset, i.e. it is self-hosting. In 2018, he won in the category "Most inflationary" for an image decompression program.

In 2000, he started the FFmpeg project (using the pseudonym "Gérard Lantau") and led it until 2003.

In 2002, he developed TinyGL, a subset of OpenGL suitable for embedded environments.

In 2003, he pushed the first commits of QEMU, developing it solo through v0.7.1 in 2005.

In 2004, he wrote the TinyCC Boot Loader, which can compile and boot a Linux kernel from source in less than 15 seconds. In 2005, he designed a system that could act as an Analog or DVB-T Digital TV transmitter by directly generating a VHF signal from a standard PC and VGA card. In 2011, he created a minimal PC emulator written in pure JavaScript. The emulated hardware consists of a 32-bit x86 compatible CPU, a 8259 Programmable Interrupt Controller, a 8254 Programmable Interrupt Timer, and a 16450 UART.

On 31 December 2009, he claimed the world record for calculations of pi, having calculated it to nearly 2.7 trillion places in 90 days. Slashdot wrote: "While the improvement may seem small, it is an outstanding achievement because only a single desktop PC, costing less than US$3,000, was used—instead of a multi-million dollar supercomputer as in the previous records." On 2 August 2010, this record was eclipsed by Shigeru Kondo who computed 5 trillion digits, although this was done using a server-class machine running dual Intel Xeon processors, equipped with 96 GB of RAM.

In 2011, he won an O'Reilly Open Source Award.

In 2014, he proposed the Better Portable Graphics (BPG) image format as a replacement for JPEG.

In July 2019, he released QuickJS, a small and embeddable JavaScript engine.

In April 2021, his artificial neural network–based data compressor, NNCP, took first place out of hundreds in the Large Text Compression Benchmark. The compressor uses Bellard's own artificial neural network library, LibNC ("C Library for Tensor Manipulation"), which is publicly available.

In August 2023, Bellard released ts_zip, a lossless text compressor using a large language model. He updated it in March 2024, making the algorithm considerably faster as well as hardware-independent.

In April 2024, Bellard released TSAC, an audio compression utility that can achieve very low bitrates of 5.5kbit/s (mono) or 7.5kbit/s (stereo) while still preserving reasonable audio quality at 44.1 kHz.

In December 2025, Bellard released MicroQuickJS, a Javascript engine targeted at embedded systems. It compiles and runs Javascript programs with as low as 10 kB of RAM at speeds comparable to QuickJS.

== See also ==
- PiHex
