= Thomas Fantet de Lagny =

French mathematician (1660–1734)

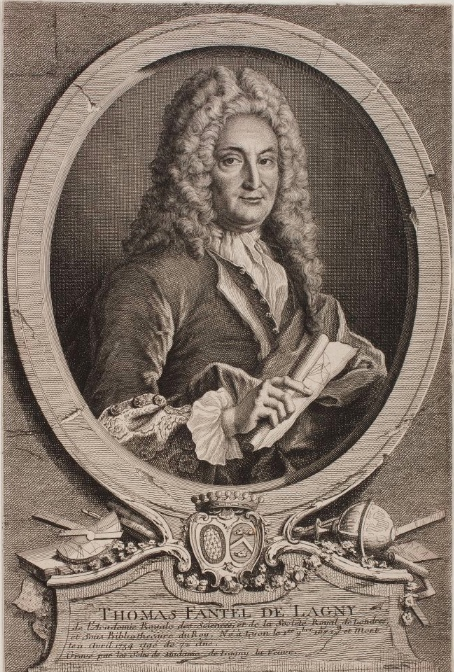
- Born: 7 November 1660; Lyon, Lyonnais, France
- Died: 11 April 1734 (aged 73); Paris, France
- Known for: Calculating π
- Scientific career
- Fields: Mathematics
- Institutions: French Academy of Sciences
- Notable students: Adrien Maurice de Noailles

Thomas Fantet de Lagny (7 November 1660 – 11 April 1734) was a French mathematician, well known for his contributions to computational mathematics, and for calculating π to 112 correct decimal places.

== Biography ==
Thomas Fantet de Lagny was son of Pierre Fantet, a royal official in Grenoble, and Jeanne d'Azy, the daughter of a physician from Montpellier.

He entered a Jesuit College in Lyon, where he became passionate about mathematics, as he studied some mathematical texts such as Euclid by Georges Fournier and an algebra text by Jacques Pelletier du Mans. Then he studied three years in the Faculty of Law in Toulouse.

In 1686, he went to Paris and became a mathematics tutor to the Noailles family. He collaborated with de l'Hospital under the name of de Lagny, and at that time he started publishing his first mathematical papers.
He came back to Lyon when, on 11 December 1695, he was named an associate of the Académie Royale des Sciences. Then, in 1697, he became professor of hydrography at Rochefort for 16 years.

De Lagny returned to Paris in 1714, and became a librarian at the Bibliothèque du roi, and a deputy director of the Banque Générale between 1716 and 1718. On 7 July 1719, he was awarded a pension by the Académie Royale des Sciences, finally earning his living from science. In 1723, he became a pensionnaire at the academy, replacing Pierre Varignon who died in 1722, but had to retire in 1733.

De Lagny died on 11 April 1734. While he was dying, someone asked him: "What is the square of 12?" and he answered immediately: "144."

== Computing π ==
In 1719, de Lagny calculated π to 127 decimal places, using Gregory's series for arctangent, but only 112 decimals were correct. This remained the record until 1789, when Jurij Vega calculated 126 correct digits of π.

== Bibliography ==
- Méthode nouvelle infiniment générale et infiniment abrégée pour l’extraction des racines quarrées, cubiques... (Paris, 1691)
- Méthodes nouvelles et abrégées pour l’extraction et l’approximation des racines (Paris, 1692)
- Nouveaux élémens d’arithmétique et d’algébre ou introduction aux mathématiques (Paris, 1697)
- Trignonmétrie française ou reformée (Rochefort, 1703)
- De la cubature de la sphére où l’on démontr une infinité de portions de sphére égales à des pyramides rectilignes (La Rochelle, 1705)
- Analyse générale ou Méthodes nouvelles pour résoudre les probémes de tous les genres et de tous degrés à l’infini, M. Richer, ed. (Paris, 1733)
