= Kikuo Takano =

Japanese poet and mathematician

Kikuo Takano (高野 喜久雄, Takano Kikuo; November 20, 1927 – May 1, 2006) was a Japanese poet and mathematician. He was born on Sado Island in 1927. He graduated from Utsunomiya Agricultural College in 1948.

He began to write poems from the day after Japan had ended its role in World War II. Being inspired from surrealism and Heidegger, he wrote poems that ask the meaning of being. He was part of the VOU and Arechi poetry groups, and was awarded the Attilio Bertolucci Award for his poetry.

Takano also discovered a Machin-like formula for calculating pi.

== Selected bibliography ==
- Takano, Kikuo (2004). Toward Meaning: Poems of Kikuo Takano. P.S., A Press, Middletown Springs, VT. ISBN 1-889087-10-6. OCLC 57022910.
- Takano, Kikuo (2003). In the High Sky - Selected Poems (Italian). Mondadori (Italy). ISBN 88-04-51316-0. OCLC 59881533.
