= Hitachi SR8000 =

The Hitachi SR8000 is a high-performance supercomputer manufactured by the Hitachi c. 2001. It comprises 4 to 512 nodes, each containing multiple Hitachi RISC microprocessors. Cooperative microprocessors are assigned to the same address space for synchronicity within each node.

In 2002, Yasumasa Kanada calculated the decimal expansion of pi to 1.24 trillion digits using this model.
