= Binary splitting =

Algorithmic technique

In mathematics, binary splitting is a technique for speeding up numerical evaluation of many types of series with rational terms. In particular, it can be used to evaluate hypergeometric series at rational points.

== Method ==
Given a series

$$S(a,b) = \sum_{n=a}^b \frac{p_n}{q_n}$$

where p_{n} and q_{n} are integers, the goal of binary splitting is to compute integers P(a, b) and Q(a, b) such that

$$S(a,b) = \frac{P(a,b)}{Q(a,b)}.$$

The splitting consists of setting m = [(a + b)/2] and recursively computing P(a, b) and Q(a, b) from P(a, m), P(m, b), Q(a, m), and Q(m, b). When a and b are sufficiently close, P(a, b) and Q(a, b) can be computed directly from p_{a}...p_{b} and q_{a}...q_{b}.

== Comparison with other methods ==
Binary splitting requires more memory than direct term-by-term summation, but is asymptotically faster since the sizes of all occurring subproducts are reduced. Additionally, whereas the most naive evaluation scheme for a rational series uses a full-precision division for each term in the series, binary splitting requires only one final division at the target precision; this is not only faster, but conveniently eliminates rounding errors. To take full advantage of the scheme, fast multiplication techniques such as Toom–Cook multiplication and the Schönhage–Strassen algorithm must be used; with ordinary O(n^{2}) multiplication, binary splitting may render no speedup at all or be slower.

Since all subdivisions of the series can be computed independently of each other, binary splitting lends well to parallelization and checkpointing.

In a less specific sense, binary splitting may also refer to any divide and conquer algorithm that always divides the problem in two halves.
