= Jurij Vega =

Slovene mathematician, physicist, and artillery officer

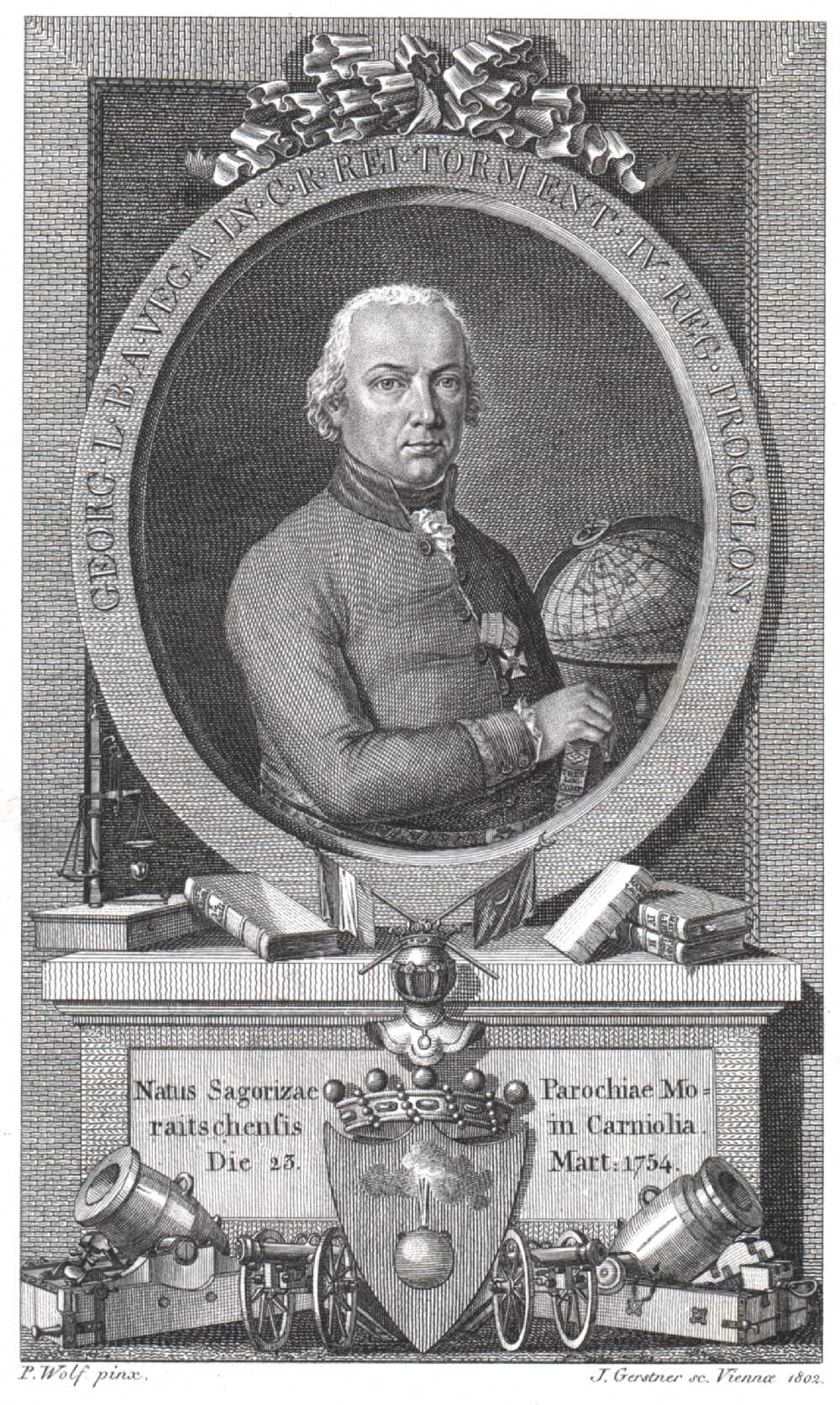
- Vega in an 1802 illustration
- Born: Jurij Bartolomej Vega; March 23, 1754; Zagorica pri Dolskem, Habsburg monarchy, Holy Roman Empire (now Slovenia)
- Died: September 26, 1802 (aged 48); Nußdorf near Vienna, Archduchy of Austria
- Education: Jesuit College of Ljubljana (Jezuitski kolegij v Ljubljani) (1767–1773)
- Alma mater: Ljubljana Lyceum (Licej v Ljubljani) (1773–1775; diploma, 1775)
- Scientific career
- Institutions: Academy of Practical Sciences in Mainz
- Academic advisors: Gabriel Gruber; Joseph Giuseppe Jakob von Maffei
- Notable students: Ignaz Lindner

Baron Jurij Bartolomej Vega (also spelled Veha; Latin: Georgius Bartholomaei Vecha; German: Georg Freiherr von Vega; born Vehovec, March 23, 1754 – September 26, 1802) was a Slovene mathematician, physicist, and artillery commissioned officer.

== Early life ==
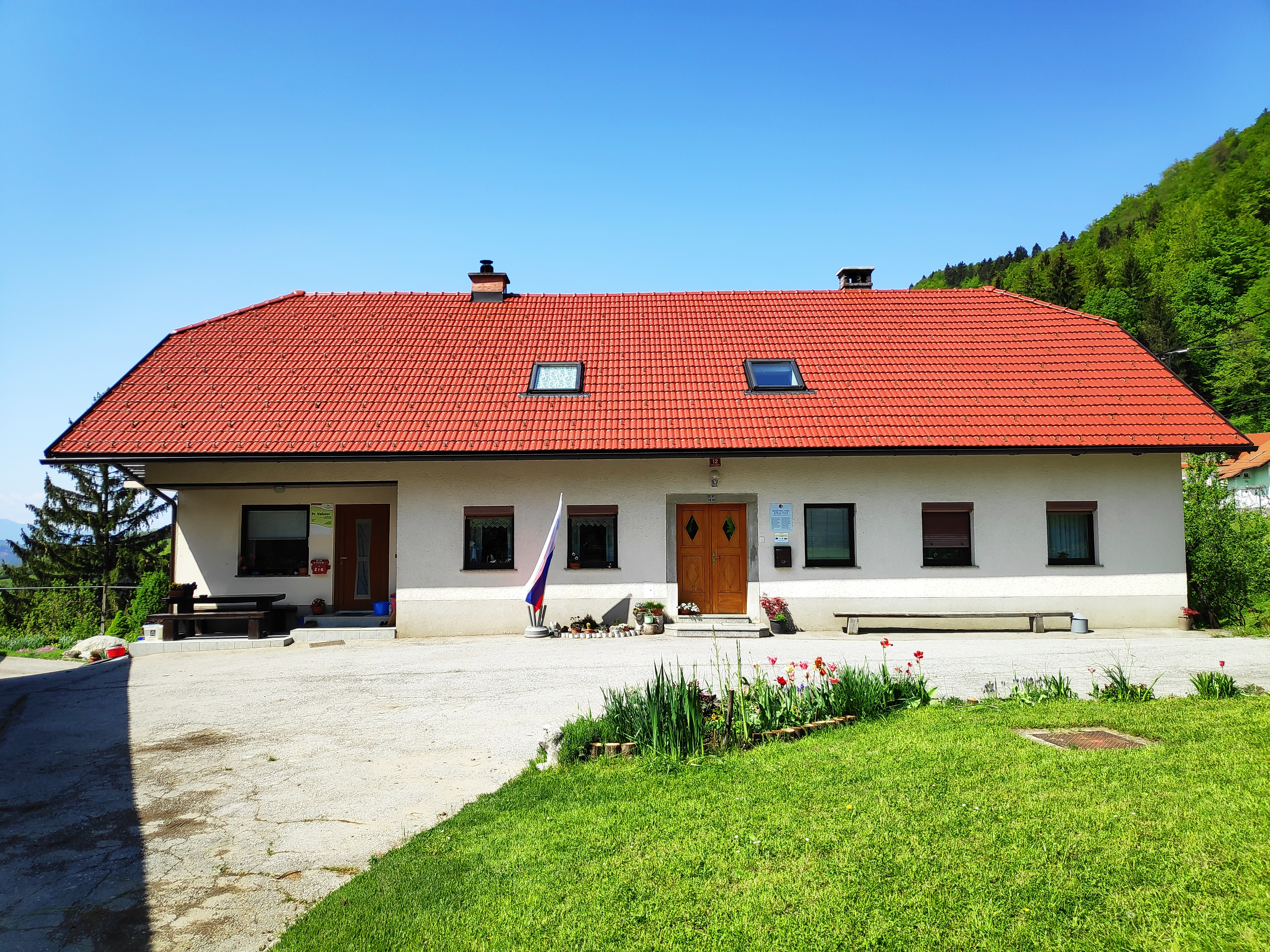
Jurij Vega's birthplace

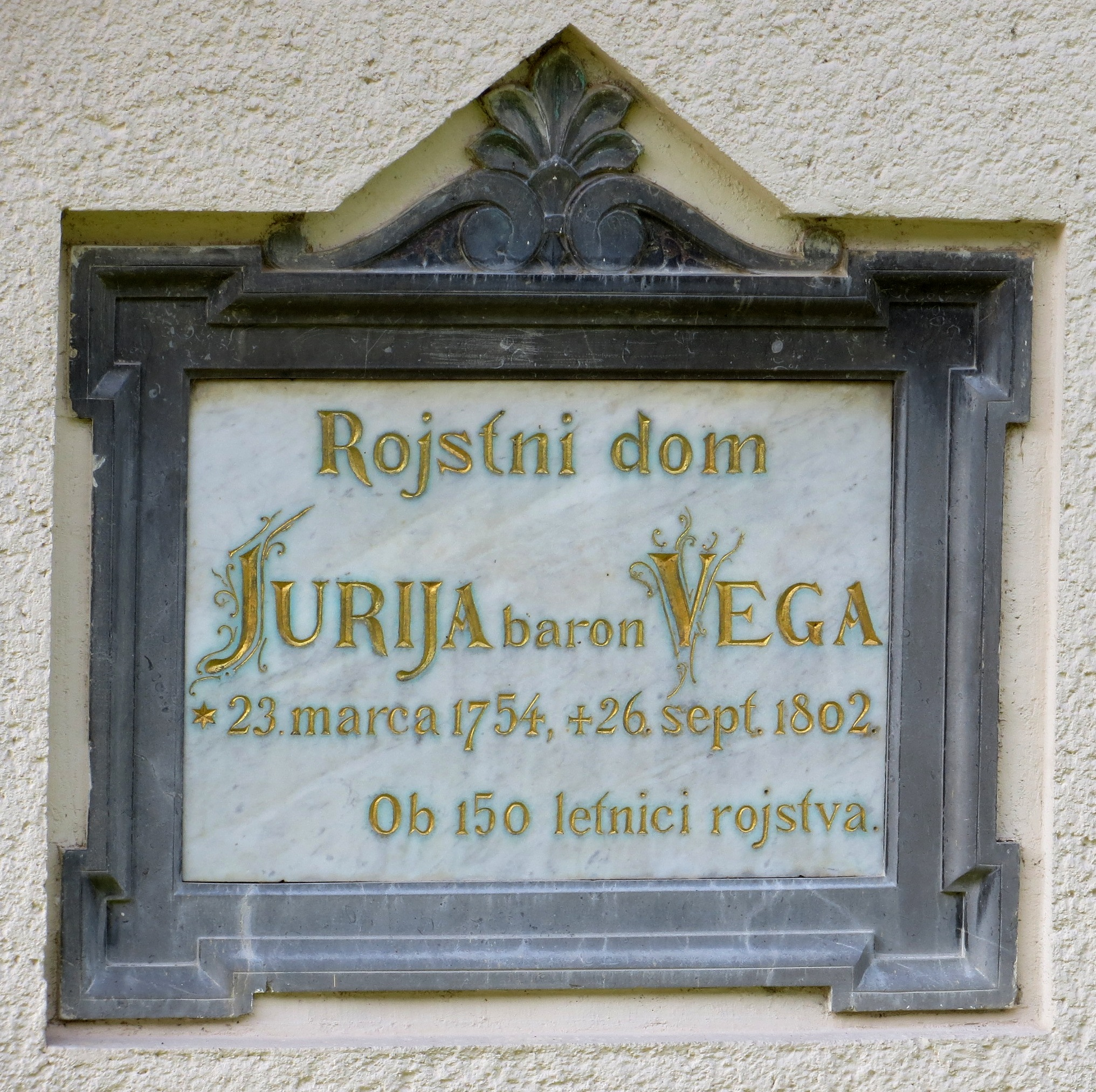
Plaque on the house

Born into a farmer's family in the small village of Zagorica, east of Ljubljana in present-day Slovenia, Jurij Vega was six years old when his father, Jernej Veha, died.

He was first educated in Moravče and then attended high school for six years (1767–1773) at the Jesuit College in Ljubljana (Jezuitski kolegij v Ljubljani), where he studied Latin, Greek, religion, German, history, geography, science, and mathematics. At the time, the college had around 500 students. He was a schoolmate of Anton Tomaž Linhart, the Slovenian writer and historian.

Vega completed high school in 1773 at the age of 19. Afterward, he studied at the Lyceum of Ljubljana and became a navigational engineer in 1775. A copy of his Tentamen philosophicum—a list of questions for his comprehensive examination—has been preserved and is housed in the Mathematical Library in Ljubljana. The problems include topics in logic, algebra, metaphysics, geometry, trigonometry, geodesy, stereometry, the geometry of curves, ballistics, and general and special physics.

== Military service ==
Vega left Ljubljana five years after graduating and entered military service in 1780, becoming a professor of mathematics at the Artillery School in Vienna. Around this time, he began using the surname Vega instead of his original surname, Veha.

At the age of 33, Vega married Josefa Svoboda (also spelled Jožefa Swoboda) (1771–1800), a Czech noblewoman from České Budějovice, who was 16 years old at the time.

Vega participated in several military campaigns. In 1788, he served under Austrian Imperial Field Marshal Ernst Gideon von Laudon (1717–1790) in a campaign against the Ottoman Empire at Belgrade. His command of several mortar batteries significantly contributed to the fall of the Belgrade fortress.

Between 1793 and 1797, he fought against French Revolutionary forces under the command of Austrian General Dagobert-Sigismond de Wurmser (1724–1797) as part of the European coalition allied with Austria. Vega participated in battles at Fort Louis, Mannheim, Mainz, Wiesbaden, Kehl, and Diez.

In 1795, he designed two 30-pound (14 kg) mortars with conically drilled bases and larger charges, increasing their firing range to up to 3,000 metres (3,300 yards). By comparison, the older 60-pound (27 kg) mortars had a range of only 1,800 metres (2,000 yards).

In September 1802, Vega was reported missing. After a few days, his body was found. A police report concluded that his death was accidental. It is believed that he died on 26 September 1802 in Nußdorf, a district along the Danube, near Vienna, the capital of Austria.

== Mathematical accomplishments ==
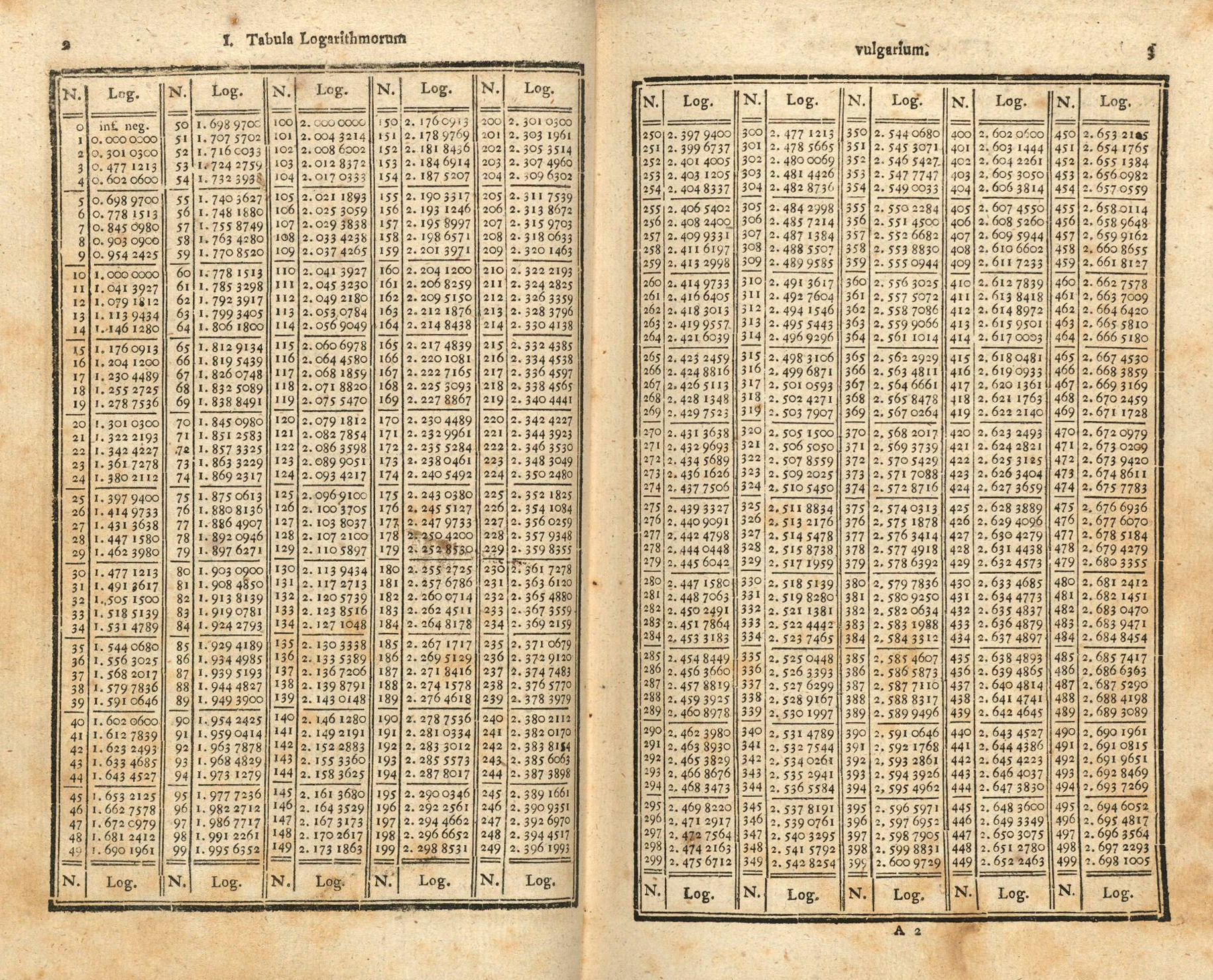
"Tabula Logarithmorum Vulgarium", 1797

Vega published a series of books containing logarithmic tables. The first volume appeared in 1783. Much later, in 1797, it was followed by a second volume that included a collection of integrals and other useful formulae. His Handbook, originally published in 1793, was later translated into several languages and issued in over 100 editions.

His most significant work was Thesaurus Logarithmorum Completus (Treasury of All Logarithms), first published in 1794 in Leipzig (its 90th edition appeared in 1924). Although based on the tables of Adriaan Vlacq, Vega's version corrected numerous errors and extended the logarithms of trigonometric functions for small angles. An engineer, Franc Allmer, an honorary senator of the Graz University of Technology, discovered a copy of Vega's 10-digit logarithmic tables in the Museum of Carl Friedrich Gauss in Göttingen. Gauss frequently used Vega's tables and even wrote calculations in the margins. He also found and marked some errors in the millions of values Vega had calculated.

A copy of Thesaurus Logarithmorum Completus from the private collection of mathematician and computing pioneer Charles Babbage (1791–1871) is preserved at the Royal Observatory, Edinburgh.

Over the years, Vega also wrote a four-volume textbook titled Vorlesungen über die Mathematik (Lectures on Mathematics). Volume I was published in 1782 when Vega was 28 years old, followed by Volume II in 1784, Volume III in 1788, and Volume IV in 1800. These textbooks include valuable tables; for example, Volume II contains closed-form expressions for the sines of multiples of 3 degrees, presented in a user-friendly format.

Vega also authored at least six scientific papers. On August 20, 1789, he set a world record by calculating pi to 140 decimal places, of which the first 126 were correct. He submitted this calculation to the Russian Academy of Sciences in Saint Petersburg in his booklet V. razprava (The Fifth Discussion), in which he identified an error at the 113th decimal place in the previous best estimate by Thomas Fantet de Lagny (1660–1734), which had claimed 127 digits. Vega's record held for 52 years, until 1841, and his method remains notable to this day. The academy published his result only in 1795, six years after submission. Vega improved upon John Machin's 1706 formula:

$${\pi\over 4} = 4 \arctan \left({1\over 5}\right) - \arctan \left({1\over 239}\right)$$

with his own formula, equivalent to one used by Leonhard Euler in 1755:

$${\pi\over 4} = 5 \arctan \left({1\over 7}\right) + 2 \arctan \left({3\over 79}\right),$$

which converges faster than Machin's version. He also cross-checked his results using Charles Hutton’s formula:

$${\pi\over 4} = 2 \arctan \left({1\over 3}\right) + \arctan \left({1\over 7}\right).$$

Vega only developed the second term of the series once in his calculations.

Although he made contributions to ballistics, physics, and astronomy, his most enduring legacy lies in the field of mathematics during the second half of the 18th century.

In 1781, Vega advocated for the adoption of the decimal metric system of units within the Austrian Habsburg monarchy. While his proposal was not accepted at the time, the system was officially introduced later under Emperor Franz Joseph I in 1871.

Vega was a member of several scholarly societies, including the Academy of Practical Sciences in Mainz, the Physical and Mathematical Society of Erfurt, the Bohemian Scientific Society in Prague, and the Prussian Academy of Sciences in Berlin. He was also an associate member of the British Scientific Society in Göttingen. On May 11, 1796, he was awarded the Order of Maria Theresa, and in 1800 he was granted the title of hereditary baron, along with the right to a personal coat of arms.

== Legacy ==
Jurij Vega High School (Gimnazija Jurija Vege) in Idrija was founded in 1901 as the first Slovene Realschule.

In 1935, the Vega (crater) on the Moon was named in his honor. In March 1993, the National Bank of Slovenia issued a 50 tolar banknote featuring Jurij Vega. The Slovenian Post also issued a commemorative stamp in his honor in 1994. In 2004, Slovenia released commemorative coins marking the 250th anniversary of Vega's birth.

The asteroid 14966 Jurijvega, discovered on July 30, 1997, was named after him. Slovenia's Vega Astronomical Society is named in honor of both Jurij Vega and the star Vega. However, the star Vega is not named after Jurij Vega; its name predates him by centuries.

A free, open-source physics library for 3D deformable object simulation, Vega FEM, is also named after Jurij Vega.

== Scientific genealogy ==
Vega is also notable for being the tutor and academic advisor of Ignaz Lindner, resulting in a notable scientific genealogy (see Academic genealogy of theoretical physicists: Jurij Vega).
