= PiHex =

Software for calculating the bits of Pi

- Developers: Colin Percival and 1,246 volunteers
- Operating system: Cross-platform
- Platform: Distributed computing (≈1,885 computers)
- Type: Distributed computing
- Repository: wayback.cecm.sfu.ca/projects/pihex/source.html

PiHex was a distributed computing project organized by Colin Percival to calculate specific bits of π. 1,246 contributors used idle time slices on almost two thousand computers to make its calculations. The software used for the project made use of Bellard's formula, a faster version of the BBP formula.

== History ==
To calculate the five trillionth digit (and the following seventy-six digits) took 13,500 CPU hours, using 25 computers from 6 countries. The forty trillionth digit required 84,500 CPU hours and 126 computers from 18 countries. The highest calculation, the one quadrillionth digit, took 1.2 million CPU hours and 1,734 computers from 56 countries. Total resources: 1,885 computers donated 1.3 million CPU hours. The average computer that was used to calculate would have taken 148 years to complete the calculations alone.

After setting three records, calculating the five trillionth bit, the forty trillionth bit, and the quadrillionth bit, the project ended on September 11, 2000.

While the PiHex project calculated the least significant digits of π ever attempted at the time in any base, the second place is held by Peter Trueb who computed some 22+ trillion digits in 2016 and third place by houkouonchi who derived the 13.3 trillionth digit in base 10.

== Algorithm ==
Unlike most computations of π, which compute results in base 10, PiHex computed in base 2 (bits), because Bellard's formula and the BBP formula could only be used to compute π in base 2 at the time.

The final bit strings for each of the three calculations resulted as such:

- Binary digits of π from five trillion minus three to five trillion and seventy-six (completed August 30, 1998):

0000 0111 1110 0100 0101 0111 0011 0011 1100 1100
   ^ Five trillionth bit of π
0111 1001 0000 1011 0101 1011 0101 1001 0111 1001

- Binary digits of π from forty trillion minus three to forty trillion and sixty-four (February 9, 1999):

1010 0000 1111 1001 1111 1111 0011 0111 0001 1101
   ^ Forty trillionth bit of π
0001 0111 0101 1001 0011 1110 0000

- Binary digits of π from one quadrillion minus three to one quadrillion and sixty (September 11, 2000):

1110 0110 0010 0001 0110 1011 0000 0110 1001 1100
   ^ Quadrillionth bit of π
1011 0110 1100 0001 1101 0011
