= Yasumasa Kanada =

Japanese mathematician (1949–2020)

Yasumasa Kanada (金田 康正, Kanada Yasumasa; 1949 – 11 February 2020) was a Japanese computer scientist most known for his numerous world records over three decades for calculating digits of π. He set the record 11 of the past 21 times.

== Career ==
Kanada was a professor in the Department of Information Science at the University of Tokyo in Tokyo, Japan until 2015.

== Pi records ==
From 2002 until 2009, Kanada held the world record calculating the number of digits in the decimal expansion of pi – exactly 1.2411 trillion digits. The calculation took more than 600 hours on 64 nodes of a HITACHI SR8000/MPP supercomputer. Some of his competitors in recent years include Jonathan and Peter Borwein and the Chudnovsky brothers.

== See also ==
- Chronology of computation of pi
