= John Machin =

English mathematician (bapt. 1686 – 1751)

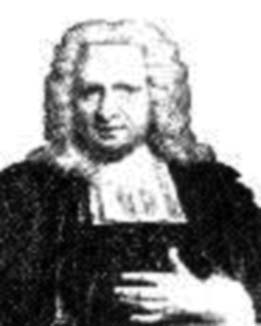
- John Machin
- Baptised: c. 1686; London, England
- Died: 9 June 1751; London, England
- Known for: Machin-like formula
- Scientific career
- Fields: Mathematician and astronomer
- Workplaces: Gresham College
- Notable students: Brook Taylor

John Machin (bapt. c. 1686 – June 9, 1751) was a professor of astronomy at Gresham College, London. He is best known for developing a quickly converging series for pi in 1706 and using it to compute pi to 100 decimal places.

== History ==
John Machin served as secretary of the Royal Society from 1718 to 1747. He was also a member of the commission which decided the Calculus priority dispute between Leibniz and Newton in 1712.

On 16 May 1713 he succeeded Alexander Torriano as professor of astronomy in Gresham College, and held the post until his death, which occurred in London on 9 June 1751. Machin enjoyed a high mathematical reputation. In 1706, Machin computed the value of π with the formula given below to one hundred decimal places. His ingenious quadrature of the circle was later investigated by Charles Hutton. A mass of his manuscripts is preserved by the Royal Astronomical Society; and writing to William Jones in 1727, he asserted his claim to the parliamentary reward of £10,000 for amending the lunar tables.

In 1728, he was listed as one of the subscribers to the Cyclopaedia of Ephraim Chambers.

== Formula ==
Machin's formula (for which the derivation is straightforward) is:

$$\frac{\pi}{4} = 4 \arctan \frac{1}{5} - \arctan \frac{1}{239}$$

The benefit of the new formula, a variation on the Gregory–Leibniz series (π/4 = arctan 1), was that it had a significantly increased rate of convergence, which made it a much more practical method of calculation.

To compute π to 100 decimal places, he combined his formula with the Taylor series expansion for the inverse tangent. (Brook Taylor was Machin's contemporary in Cambridge University.) Machin's formula remained the primary tool of pi-hunters for centuries (well into the computer era).

Several other Machin-like formulae are known.

== See also ==
- Gresham Professor of Astronomy
