= GCD =

GCD may refer to:

- Greatest common divisor
  - Binary GCD algorithm
  - Polynomial greatest common divisor
  - Lehmer's GCD algorithm
- Great-circle distance
- GCD, Chinese Internet slang for the Chinese Communist Party (Chinese: 共产党; pinyin: Gòngchǎndǎng)
- General content descriptor, a wireless device file format
- Geneva Consensus Declaration, a non-binding anti-abortion statement signed by a handful of nations
- Global Cities Dialogue, an international development organisation
- Grand Central Dispatch, a parallel computing framework
- Grand Comics Database
- Grant County Regional Airport, near John Day, Oregon, United States
- Griffith College Dublin, in Dublin, Ireland
- Yukulta language, spoken in Australia
- Graphics Compute Die
