= Coprime integers =

Two numbers without shared prime factors

In number theory, two integers a and b are coprime, relatively prime or mutually prime if the only positive integer that is a divisor of both of them is 1. Consequently, any prime number that divides a does not divide b, and vice versa. This is equivalent to their greatest common divisor (GCD) being 1. One says also a is prime to b or a is coprime with b.

The numbers 8 and 9 are coprime, although neither—considered individually—is a prime number, since 1 is their only common divisor. On the other hand, 6 and 9 are not coprime, because they are both divisible by 3. The numerator and denominator of a reduced fraction are coprime, by definition.

== Notation and testing ==
When the integers a and b are coprime, the standard way of expressing this fact in mathematical notation is to indicate that their greatest common divisor is one, by the formula gcd(a, b) = 1 or (a, b) = 1. In their 1989 textbook Concrete Mathematics, Ronald Graham, Donald Knuth, and Oren Patashnik proposed an alternative notation $a\perp b$ to indicate that a and b are relatively prime and that the term "prime" be used instead of coprime (as in a is prime to b).

A fast way to determine whether two numbers are coprime is given by the Euclidean algorithm and its faster variants such as binary GCD algorithm or Lehmer's GCD algorithm.

The number of integers coprime to a positive integer n, between 1 and n, is given by Euler's totient function, also known as Euler's phi function, φ(n).

A set of integers can also be called coprime if its elements share no common positive factor except 1. A stronger condition on a set of integers is pairwise coprime, which means that a and b are coprime for every pair (a, b) of different integers in the set. The set {2, 3, 4} is coprime, but it is not pairwise coprime since 2 and 4 are not relatively prime.

== Properties ==
The numbers 1 and −1 are the only integers coprime with every integer, and they are the only integers that are coprime with 0.

A number of conditions are equivalent to a and b being coprime:

- No prime number divides both a and b.
- There exist integers x, y such that ax + by = 1 (see Bézout's identity).
- The integer b has a multiplicative inverse modulo a, meaning that there exists an integer y such that by ≡ 1 (mod a). In ring-theoretic language, b is a unit in the ring $\Z/a\Z$ of integers modulo a.
- Every pair of congruence relations for an unknown integer x, of the form x ≡ k (mod a) and x ≡ m (mod b), has a solution (Chinese remainder theorem); in fact the solutions are described by a single congruence relation modulo ab.
- The least common multiple of a and b is equal to their product ab, i.e. lcm(a, b) = ab.

As a consequence of the third point, if a and b are coprime and br ≡ bs (mod a), then r ≡ s (mod a). That is, we may "divide by b" when working modulo a. Furthermore, if b_{1}, b_{2} are both coprime with a, then so is their product b_{1}b_{2} (i.e., modulo a it is a product of invertible elements, and therefore invertible); this also follows from the first point by Euclid's lemma, which states that if a prime number p divides a product bc, then p divides at least one of the factors b, c.

As a consequence of the first point, if a and b are coprime, then so are any powers a^{k} and b^{m}.

If a and b are coprime and a divides the product bc, then a divides c. This can be viewed as a generalization of Euclid's lemma.

Figure 1. The numbers 4 and 9 are coprime. Therefore, the diagonal of a 4 × 9 lattice does not intersect any other lattice points

The two integers a and b are coprime if and only if the point with coordinates (a, b) in a Cartesian coordinate system would be "visible" via an unobstructed line of sight from the origin (0, 0), in the sense that there is no point with integer coordinates anywhere on the line segment between the origin and (a, b). (See figure 1.)

In a sense that can be made precise, the probability that two randomly chosen integers are coprime is 6/π^{2}, which is about 61% (see § Probability of coprimality, below).

Two natural numbers a and b are coprime if and only if the numbers 2^{a} − 1 and 2^{b} − 1 are coprime. As a generalization of this, following easily from the Euclidean algorithm in base n > 1:

$$\gcd\left(n^a - 1, n^b - 1\right) = n^{\gcd(a, b)} - 1.$$

== Coprimality in sets ==
A set of integers $S=\{a_1,a_2, \dots, a_n\}$ can also be called coprime or setwise coprime if the greatest common divisor of all the elements of the set is 1. For example, the integers 6, 10, 15 are coprime because 1 is the only positive integer that divides all of them.

If every pair in a set of integers is coprime, then the set is said to be pairwise coprime (or pairwise relatively prime, mutually coprime or mutually relatively prime). Pairwise coprimality is a stronger condition than setwise coprimality; every pairwise coprime finite set is also setwise coprime, but the reverse is not true. For example, the integers 4, 5, 6 are (setwise) coprime (because the only positive integer dividing all of them is 1), but they are not pairwise coprime (because gcd(4, 6) = 2).

The concept of pairwise coprimality is important as a hypothesis in many results in number theory, such as the Chinese remainder theorem.

It is possible for an infinite set of integers to be pairwise coprime. Notable examples include the set of all prime numbers, the set of elements in Sylvester's sequence, and the set of all Fermat numbers.

== Probability of coprimality ==
Given two randomly chosen integers a and b, it is reasonable to ask how likely it is that a and b are coprime. In this determination, it is convenient to use the characterization that a and b are coprime if and only if no prime number divides both of them (see Fundamental theorem of arithmetic).

Informally, the probability that any number is divisible by a prime (or in fact any integer) p is $\tfrac{1}{p};$ for example, every 7th integer is divisible by 7. Hence the probability that two numbers are both divisible by p is $\tfrac{1}{p^2},$ and the probability that at least one of them is not is $1-\tfrac{1}{p^2}.$ Any finite collection of divisibility events associated to distinct primes is mutually independent. For example, in the case of two events, a number is divisible by primes p and q if and only if it is divisible by pq; the latter event has probability $\tfrac{1}{pq}.$ If one makes the heuristic assumption that such reasoning can be extended to infinitely many divisibility events, one is led to guess that the probability that two numbers are coprime is given by a product over all primes,
$$\prod_{\text{prime } p} \left(1-\frac{1}{p^2}\right) = \left( \prod_{\text{prime } p} \frac{1}{1-p^{-2}} \right)^{-1} = \frac{1}{\zeta(2)} = \frac{6}{\pi^2} \approx 0.607927102 \approx 61\%.$$
Here ζ refers to the Riemann zeta function, the identity relating the product over primes to ζ(2) is an example of an Euler product, and the evaluation of ζ(2) as π^{2}/6 is the Basel problem, solved by Leonhard Euler in 1735.

There is no way to choose a positive integer at random so that each positive integer occurs with equal probability, but statements about "randomly chosen integers" such as the ones above can be formalized by using the notion of natural density. For each positive integer N, let P_{N} be the probability that two randomly chosen numbers in $\{1,2,\ldots,N\}$ are coprime. Although P_{N} will never equal 6/π^{2} exactly, with work (Note: This theorem was proved by Ernesto Cesàro in 1881. For a proof, see Hardy & Wright 2008, Theorem 332.) one can show that in the limit as $N \to \infty,$ the probability P_{N} approaches 6/π^{2}.

More generally, the probability of k randomly chosen integers being setwise coprime is $\tfrac{1}{\zeta(k)}.$

== Generating all coprime pairs ==
The tree rooted at (2, 1). The root (2, 1) is marked red, its three children are shown in orange, third generation is yellow, and so on in the rainbow order.

All pairs of positive coprime numbers (m, n) (with m > n) can be arranged in two disjoint complete ternary trees, one tree starting from (2, 1) (for even–odd and odd–even pairs), and the other tree starting from (3, 1) (for odd–odd pairs). The children of each vertex (m, n) are generated as follows:

- Branch 1: $(2m-n,m)$
- Branch 2: $(2m+n,m)$
- Branch 3: $(m+2n,n)$

This scheme is exhaustive and non-redundant with no invalid members. This can be proved by remarking that, if $(a,b)$ is a coprime pair with $a>b,$ then

- if $a>3b,$ then $(a,b)$ is a child of $(m,n)=(a-2b, b)$ along branch 3;
- if $2b<a<3b,$ then $(a,b)$ is a child of $(m,n)=(b, a-2b)$ along branch 2;
- if $b<a<2b,$ then $(a,b)$ is a child of $(m,n)=(b, 2b-a)$ along branch 1.

In all cases $(m,n)$ is a "smaller" coprime pair with $m>n.$ This process of "computing the father" can stop only if either $a=2b$ or $a=3b.$ In these cases, coprimality, implies that the pair is either $(2,1)$ or $(3,1).$

Another (much simpler) way to generate a tree of positive coprime pairs (m, n) (with m > n) is by means of two generators $f:(m,n)\rightarrow(m+n,n)$ and $g:(m,n)\rightarrow(m+n,m)$, starting with the root $(2,1)$. The resulting binary tree, the Calkin–Wilf tree, is exhaustive and non-redundant, which can be seen as follows. Given a coprime pair one recursively applies $f^{-1}$ or $g^{-1}$ depending on which of them yields a positive coprime pair with m > n. Since only one does, the tree is non-redundant. Since by this procedure one is bound to arrive at the root, the tree is exhaustive.

== Applications ==
In machine design, a more uniform gear wear is achieved by choosing the tooth counts of the two gears meshing together to be relatively prime. When a 1:1 gear ratio is desired, a gear relatively prime to the two equal-size gears may be inserted between them.

In pre-computer cryptography, some Vernam cipher machines combined several loops of key tape of different lengths. Many rotor machines combine rotors of different numbers of teeth. Such combinations work best when the entire set of lengths are pairwise coprime.

== Generalizations ==
This concept can be extended to other algebraic structures than $\Z;$ for example, polynomials whose greatest common divisor is 1 are called coprime polynomials.

=== Coprimality in ring ideals ===
Two ideals A and B in a commutative ring R are called coprime (or comaximal) if $A+B=R.$ This generalizes Bézout's identity: with this definition, two principal ideals (a) and (b) in the ring of integers $\Z$ are coprime if and only if a and b are coprime. If the ideals A and B of R are coprime, then $AB=A\cap B;$ furthermore, if C is a third ideal such that A contains BC, then A contains C. The Chinese remainder theorem can be generalized to any commutative ring, using coprime ideals.

== See also ==
- Euclid's orchard
- Superpartient number

== Bibliography ==
- Hardy, G.H.; Wright, E.M. (2008), An Introduction to the Theory of Numbers (6th ed.), Oxford University Press, ISBN 978-0-19-921986-5
- Niven, Ivan; Zuckerman, Herbert S. (1966), An Introduction to the Theory of Numbers (2nd ed.), John Wiley & Sons
- Ore, Oystein (1988) [1948], Number Theory and Its History, Dover, ISBN 978-0-486-65620-5
- Rosen, Kenneth H. (1992), Elementary Number Theory and its Applications (3rd ed.), Addison-Wesley, ISBN 978-0-201-57889-8
