= Antoine André Louis Reynaud =

French mathematician (1771–1844)

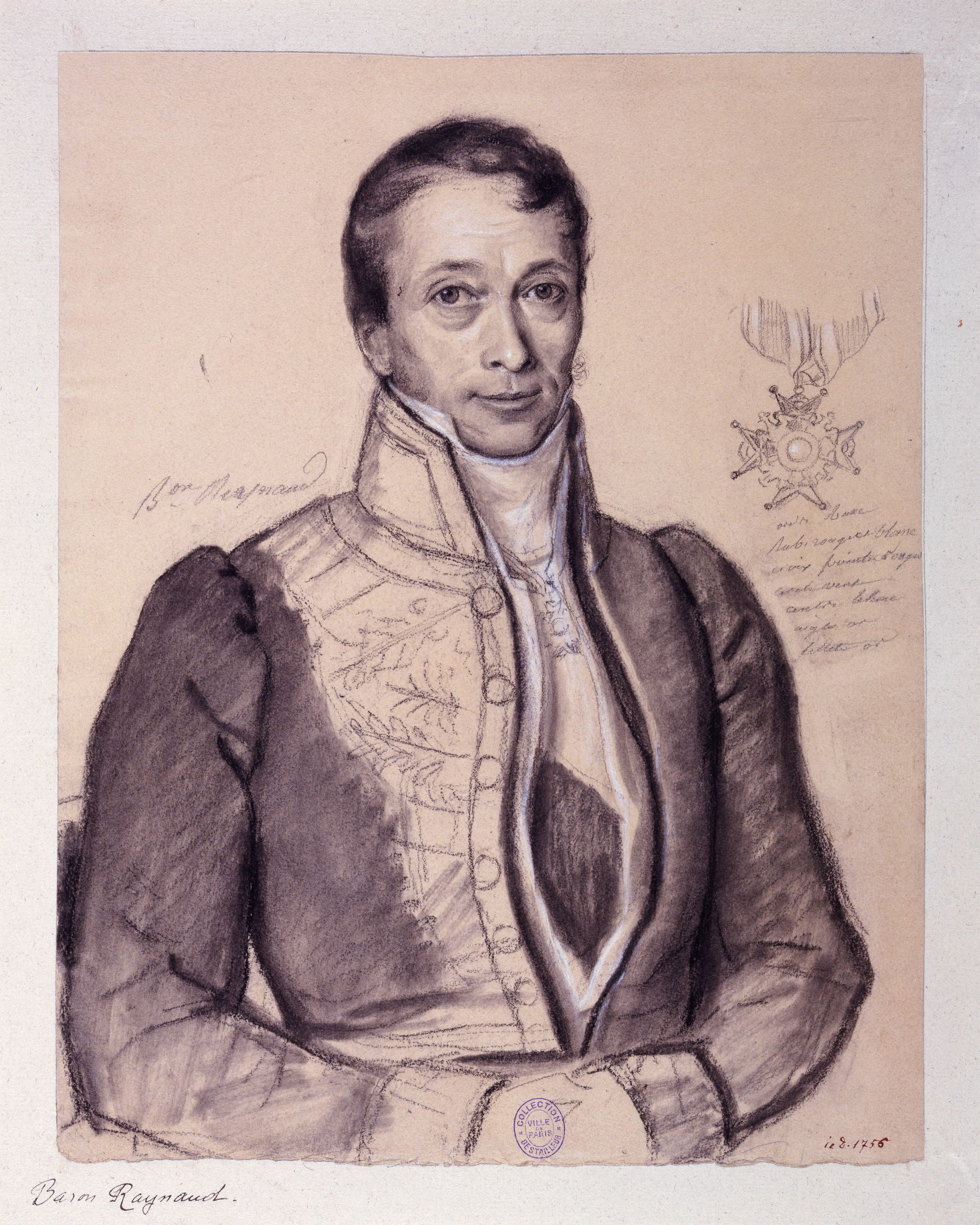
Antoine André Louis Reynaud

Antoine André Louis Reynaud, 12 September 1771 – 24 February 1844, was a French mathematician.

He was a Knight of the Legion of Honour and examiner at the École Polytechnique. His nephew was vice admiral Aimé Reynaud.

== Works ==
- Trigonométrie rectiligne et sphérique. Paris: Courcier. 1818.

== See also ==
- Euclidean algorithm
