= Umbilic torus =

Three-dimensional shape

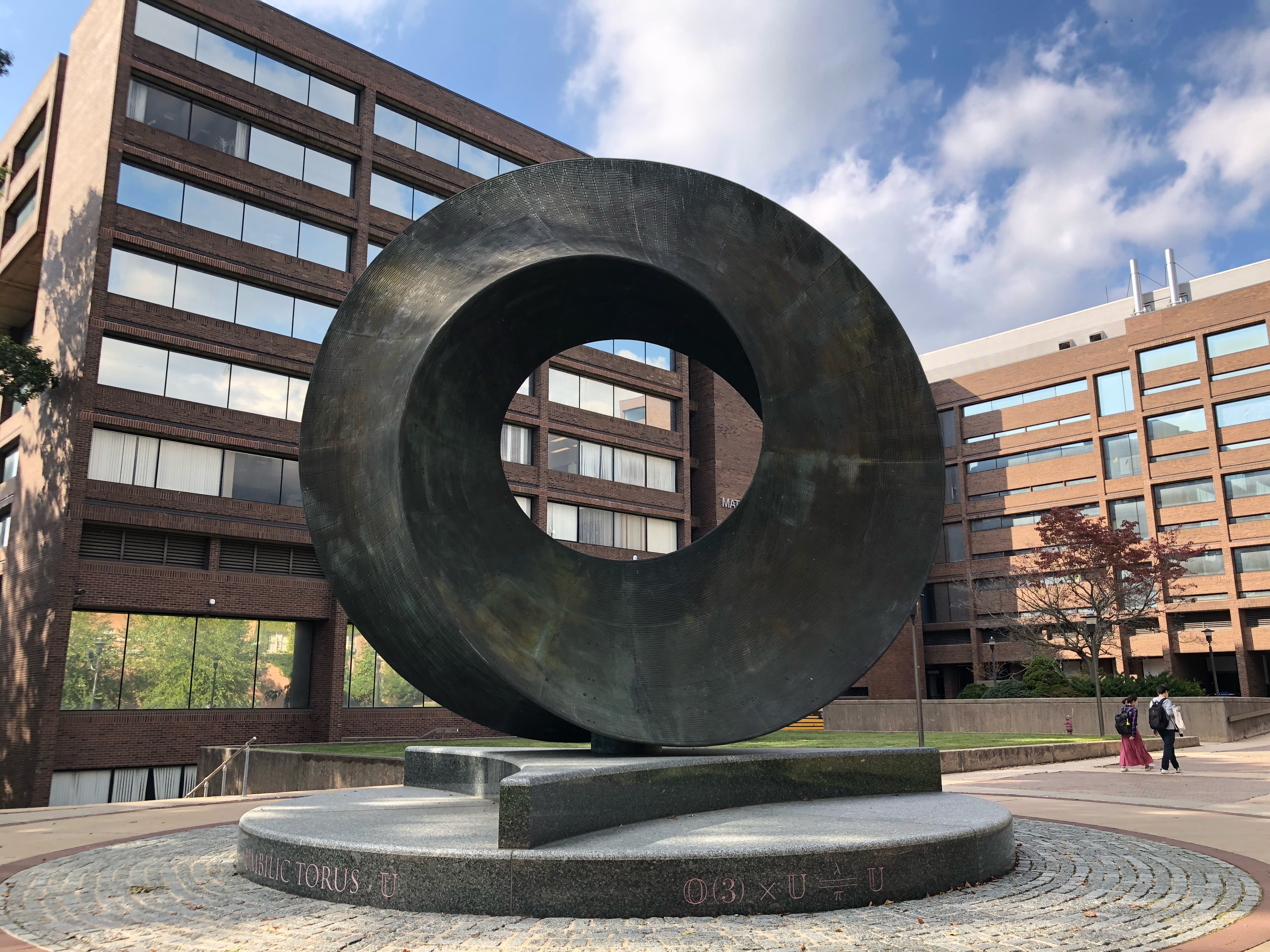
Ferguson's Umbilic Torus sculpture at Stony Brook University

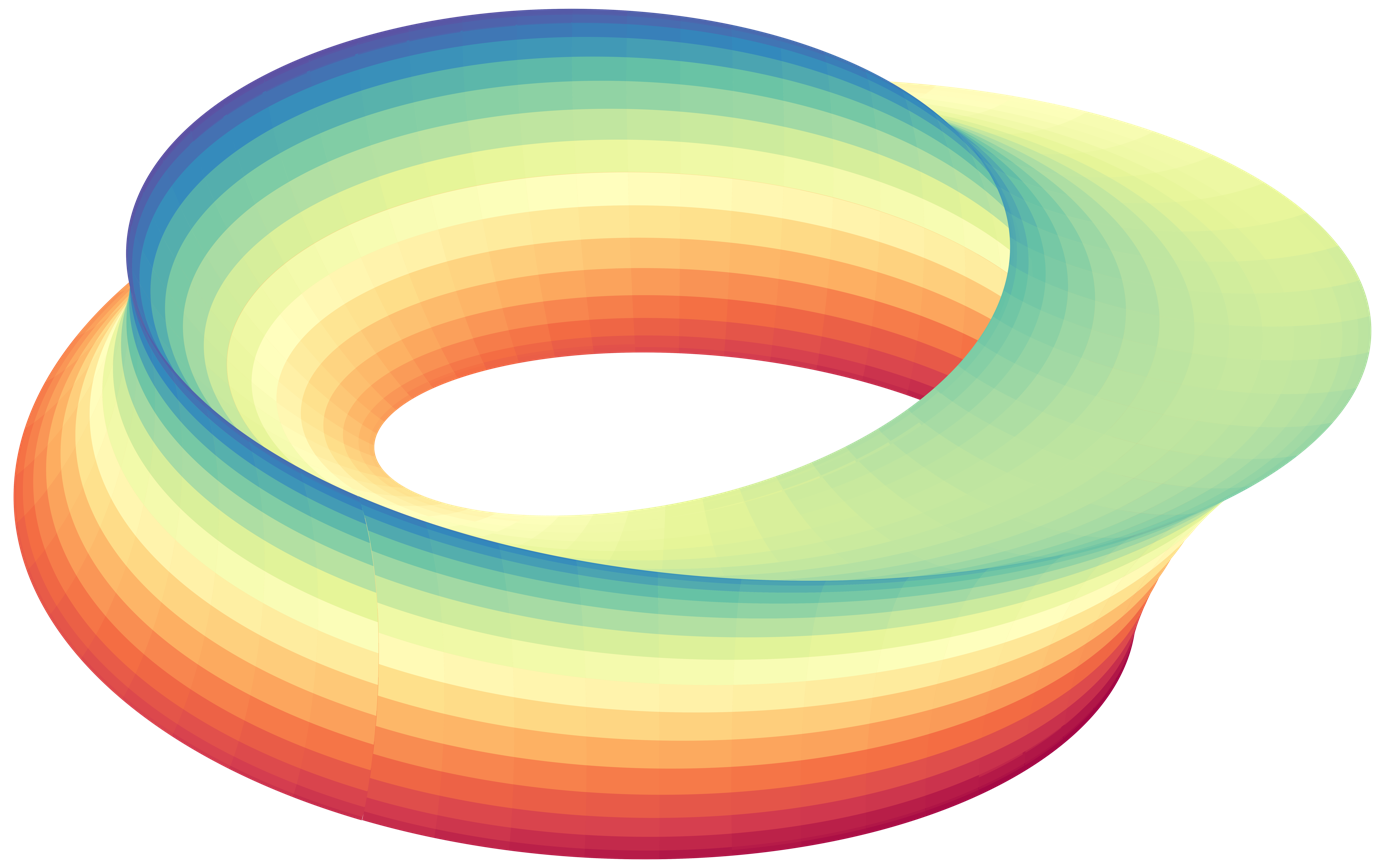
Umbilic torus surface

The umbilic torus or umbilic bracelet is a single-edged 3-dimensional shape. The lone edge goes three times around the ring before returning to the starting point. The shape also has a single external face. A cross section of the surface forms a deltoid.

The umbilic torus occurs in the mathematical subject of singularity theory, in particular in the classification of umbilical points which are determined by real cubic forms $a x^3 + 3 b x^2 y + 3 c x y^2 + d y^3$. The equivalence classes of such cubics form a three-dimensional real projective space and the subset of parabolic forms define a surface – the umbilic torus. Christopher Zeeman named this set the umbilic bracelet in 1976.

The torus is defined by the following set of parametric equations.

$$x = \sin u \left(7+\cos\left({u \over 3} - 2v\right) + 2\cos\left({u \over3} + v\right)\right)$$

$$y = \cos u \left(7 + \cos\left({u \over 3} - 2v\right) + 2\cos\left({u \over 3} + v\right)\right)$$

$$z = \sin\left({u \over 3} - 2v\right) + 2\sin \left({u \over 3} + v\right)$$

$$\text{for }-\pi \le u \le \pi,\quad -\pi \le v \le \pi$$

== In sculpture ==
John Robinson created a sculpture Eternity based on the shape in 1989, this had a triangular cross-section rather than a deltoid of a true Umbilic bracelet. This appeared on the cover of Geometric Differentiation by Ian R. Porteous.

Helaman Ferguson has created a 27-inch (69 centimeters) bronze sculpture, Umbilic Torus, and it is his most widely known piece of art. In 2010, it was announced that Jim Simons had commissioned an Umbilic Torus sculpture to be constructed outside the Math and Physics buildings at Stony Brook University, in proximity to the Simons Center for Geometry and Physics. The torus is made out of cast bronze, and is mounted on a stainless steel column. The total weight of the sculpture is 65 tonnes, and has a height of 28 feet (8.5 m). The torus has a diameter of 24 feet (7.3 m), the same diameter as the granite base. Various mathematical formulas defining the torus are inscribed on the base. Installation was completed in September, 2012.

== In literature ==
In the short story What Dead Men Tell by Theodore Sturgeon, the main action takes place in a seemingly endless corridor with the cross section of an equilateral triangle. At the end the protagonist speculates that the corridor is actually a triangular shape twisted back on itself like a Möbius strip but with the ends rotated 120 degrees before connecting them. This gave an endless corridor in which after three passes one came back to the point where one started.

== See also ==
- Mathematics and art
- Möbius strip
- Torus
