= Émile Léger =

French mathematician (1795–1838)

- Born: 15 August 1795; La Grange aux Bois, today Sainte-Menehould, France
- Died: 15 December 1838 (aged 43); Paris, France
- Education: École Polytechnique
- Known for: Euclidean algorithm
- Scientific career
- Fields: Mathematics

Émile Léger (1795–1838) was a French mathematician.

== Life and work ==
Leger studied at Lycée de Mayence (now Mainz in Germany, capital of the French department of Mont-Tonnerre during the French First Republic), where his father Claude was professor of rhetoric. In 1813 he entered the École Polytechnique. With other students, he helped defend Paris during the Hundred Days of Napoleon in March 1815, and was decorated for bravery. In 1816, he left school to go to Montmorency where his father founded an institution to prepare young people for the entrance exams to Paris universities. After his father retired, he managed the institution.

Léger only published four papers on mathematics, but one of them seems to be the first to recognize the worst case in the euclidean algorithm: when the inputs are proportional to consecutive Fibonacci numbers.

== Bibliography ==
- Shallit, Jeffrey (1994). "Origins of the analysis of the Euclidean algorithm". Historia Mathematica. 21 (4): 401–419. doi:10.1006/hmat.1994.1031. ISSN 0315-0860.
