= Aimé Reynaud =

French naval officer (1808–1876)

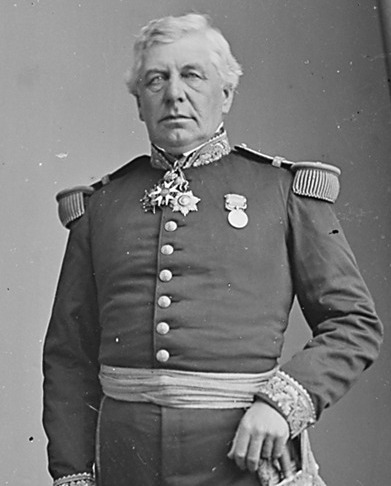
- Reynauld, c. 1860s
- Born: Aimé Félix St. Elme Reynaud; 16 September 1808; Lyon, France
- Died: 6 July 1876 (aged 67); Brest, France
- Spouse: Meta Kennedy (m. 1850)
- Relatives: Antoine André Louis Reynaud (uncle)
- Military career
- Branch: French Navy
- Rank: Vice admiral
- Commands: Salamandre; L'Ariel; Primauguet; Némésis; Guerrière
- Conflicts: Rhine crisis; Crimean War; Siege of Sevastopol; Second Opium War; Cochinchina campaign; Siege of Tourane; American Civil War
- Awards: Order of St. Gregory the Great; Order of the Holy Sepulchre; Grand Cross of the Legion of Honour

Aimé Félix St. Elme Reynaud (16 September 1808 – 6 July 1876) was a French vice admiral. He served during the Rhine crisis, the Crimean War, and the Second Opium War. He served in the North Atlantic Station during the American Civil War.

== Early life ==
Aimé Félix St. Elme Reynaud was born on 16 September 1808 in Lyon, France, to Nicolas François Reynaud. His father owned two sugar plantations, one in Saint-Louis-du-Sud and another in Port-au-Prince. Reynaud graduated first in his class from the Royal Navy College in Angoulême in 1827. He was the nephew of mathematician Antoine André Louis Reynaud.

== Career ==
On 30 September 1840, Reynaud was promoted to lieutenant. In 1850, he commanded a frigate and in 1855, he commanded a ship of the line. From 1842 to 1846, he was second in command of the corvette Le Rhin under Commander Auguste Bérard in the Pacific and during the Rhine crisis. From June to October 1845, they surveyed the Mulgrave Islands. In late 1845 or 1846, he took command of the Salamandre and was stationed in Toulon and Naples. The Salamandre was grounded on 23 June 1847 and a commission exonerated Reynaud of blame in the incident. He later commanded the L'Ariel. He was commended by Pope Pius IX on 18 April 1850 with the Order of St. Gregory the Great and the Order of the Holy Sepulchre for his services during the Rhine crisis.

In March 1854, Reynaud was nominated as captain and was promoted by November 1854. In November 1854, he was recommended by Princess Anne d'Essling for the Legion of Honour. He served under Charles Baudin and Ferdinand-Alphonse Hamelin on the French corvette Primauguet during the Crimean War and the Siege of Sevastopol. He later commanded the French frigate Némésis during the Cochinchina campaign of the Second Opium War. In 1857, he served under Charles Rigault de Genouilly. In September 1858, the Némésis attacked forts during the Siege of Tourane and Canton. He then led a naval division in Indochina.

On 17 August 1859, Reynaud was promoted to rear admiral. He took command of the North Atlantic Station in 1861, during the American Civil War. The French frigate Guerrière served as his flagship under his command. For a time, he was stationed in Martinique. In 1864, he became vice admiral and was living in Paris. He received the Grand Cross of the Legion of Honor on 28 January 1871.

== Personal life ==
Reynaud married Meta (née Crauford) Kennedy, daughter of A. C. B. Crauford, of Ardmillan on 21 October 1850. Union General Benjamin Butler gave Reynaud the nickname "Fox" in his writings.

Reynaud died on 6 July 1876 in Brest, France.

== Legacy ==
In 1948, T. D. Stewart of the National Museum of Natural History attributed Reynaud as being the likely source of a group of deformed skulls collected in 1855 from the Isla de Sacrificios.
