= General content descriptor =

A General Content Descriptor (GCD) is a file which describes downloads like ringtones and pictures to wireless devices. GCD's are plain text files. They are required by many wireless carriers to install applications on devices. The name of the file will end with a ".gcd" extension.
