= Helaman Ferguson =

American mathematician

- Born: 1940 (age 85–86); Salt Lake City, Utah, US

Helaman Rolfe Pratt Ferguson (born 1940 in Salt Lake City, Utah) is an American sculptor and a digital artist, specifically an algorist. He is also well known for his development of the PSLQ algorithm, an integer relation detection algorithm.

== Early life and education ==
Ferguson's mother died when he was about three and his father went off to serve in the Second World War. He was adopted by an Irish immigrant and raised in New York. He learned to work with his hands in an old-world style with earthen materials from his adoptive father who was a carpenter and stonemason by trade. An art-inclined math teacher in high school helped him develop his dual interests in math and art.

Ferguson is a graduate of Hamilton College, a liberal arts school in New York. In 1971, he received a Ph.D. in mathematics from the University of Washington.

== Work ==
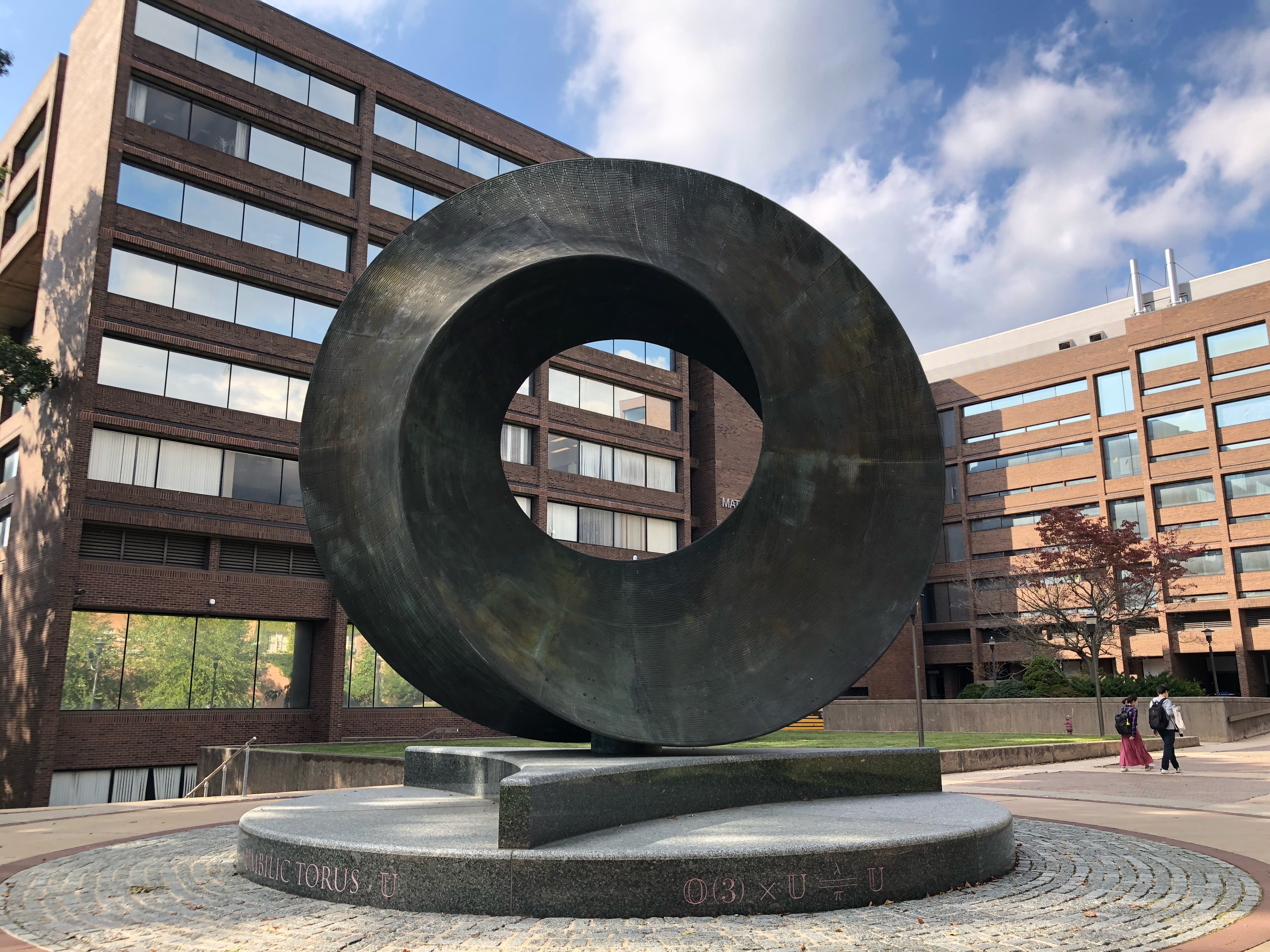
Umbilic Torus at Stony Brook University

In 1977, Ferguson and another mathematician, Rodney Forcade, developed an algorithm for integer relation detection. It was the first viable generalization of the Euclidean algorithm for three or more variables. He later developed a more notable integer relation detection algorithm – the PSLQ algorithm – which was selected as one of the "Top Ten Algorithms of the Century" by Jack Dongarra and Francis Sullivan.

In January 2014, Ferguson and his wife Claire Ferguson delivered an MAA Invited Address, titled "Mathematics in Stone and Bronze," at the Joint Math Meetings in Baltimore Maryland. He is an active artist, often representing mathematical shapes in his works. One of the first bronze torii sculpted by Ferguson was exhibited at a computer art exhibition in 1989 at the Computer Museum in Boston. His most widely known piece of art is a 69 cm (27") bronze sculpture, Umbilic Torus. In 2010, the Simons Foundation, a private institution committed to the advancement of science and mathematics, commissioned him to create the Umbilic Torus SC, a massive 8.5 m (28½') high sculpture in cast bronze and granite weighing more than nine tons. With its installation completed in 2012, the torus sculpture was donated to Stony Brook University in Long Island, N.Y., and sits outside the Math and Physics buildings of the same university, near the Simons Center for Geometry and Physics. Mounted on a stainless steel column, the torus sits on a 7.7 m (25¼') diameter granite base, where various mathematical formulas defining the torus are inscribed. To create the huge sculpture, Ferguson wrote a program consisting of 25,000 movements to control a 4.9 m (16') x 6.1 m (20') robot arm and its affixed 30 cm (12") long industrial diamond-encrusted cutting tool.

== Juggling ==
In 1987 Ferguson ran 50 miles in 16 hours while joggling. Around that time he used to make and sell juggling balls by mail.

== See also ==
- Umbilic torus
