= Chronology of computation of pi =

The table below is a brief chronology of computed numerical values of, or bounds on, the mathematical constant π. For more detailed explanations for some of these calculations, see Approximations of π.

Graph showing how the record precision of numerical approximations to pi measured in decimal places (depicted on a logarithmic scale), evolved in human history. The time before 1400 is compressed.

== Before 1400 ==
| Date | Who | Description/Computation method used | Value | Decimal places (world records in bold) | Percent error (rounded to nearest thousandth) |
|---|---|---|---|---|---|
| 2000? BC | Ancient Egyptians | 4 × (8/9)^{2} | 3.1605... | 1 | +0.602% |
| 2000? BC | Ancient Babylonians | 3 + 1/8 | 3.125 | 1 | −0.528% |
| 2000? BC | Ancient Sumerians | 3 + 23/216 | 3.1065... | 1 | −1.118% |
| 1200? BC | Ancient Chinese | 3 | 3 | 0 | −4.507% |
| 800–600 BC | Shatapatha Brahmana – 7.1.1.18 | Instructions on how to construct a circular altar from oblong bricks: "He puts on (the circular site) four (bricks) running eastwards 1; two behind running crosswise (from south to north), and two (such) in front. Now the four which he puts on running eastwards are the body; and as to there being four of these, it is because this body (of ours) consists, of four parts 2. The two at the back then are the thighs; and the two in front the arms; and where the body is that (includes) the head." | 25/8 = 3.125 | 1 | −0.528% |
| 800? BC | Shulba Sutras | (6/((2 + √2)))^{2} | 3.088311 ... | 0 | −1.696% |
| 550? BC | Bible (1 Kings 7:23) | "...a molten sea, ten cubits from the one brim to the other: it was round all about,... a line of thirty cubits did compass it round about" | 3 | 0 | −4.507% |
| 450 BC | Anaxagoras attempted to square the circle | compass and straightedge | Anaxagoras did not offer a solution | 0 | N/A |
| 420 BC | Bryson of Heraclea | inscribed and circumscribed polygons | $2 < \pi < 4$ | 0 | 0+27.324% −36.338% |
| 400 BC to AD 400 | Vyasa | verses: 6.12.40-45 of the Bhishma Parva of the Mahabharata offer: "... The Moon is handed down by memory to be eleven thousand yojanas in diameter. Its peripheral circle happens to be thirty three thousand yojanas when calculated.... The Sun is eight thousand yojanas and another two thousand yojanas in diameter. From that its peripheral circle comes to be equal to thirty thousand yojanas...." | 3 | 0 | −4.507% |
| c. 250 BC | Archimedes | 223/71 < π < 22/7 | 3.140845... < π < 3.142857... | **2** | 0+0.040% −0.024% |
| 15 BC | Vitruvius | 25/8 | 3.125 | 1 | −0.528% |
| Between 1 BC and AD 5 | Liu Xin | Unknown method giving a figure for a jialiang which implies a value for π ≈ 162/((√50+0.095)^{2}). | 3.1547... | 1 | +0.416% |
| AD 130 | Zhang Heng (Book of the Later Han) | √10 = 3.162277... 736/232 | 3.1622... | 1 | +0.658% +0.981% |
| 150 | Ptolemy | 377/120 | 3.141666... | **3** | +0.002% |
| 250 | Wang Fan | 142/45 | 3.155555... | 1 | +0.444% |
| 263 | Liu Hui | 3.141024 < π < 3.142074; 3927/1250 | 3.1416 | 3 | 0+0.015% −0.018% −2.338×10^{−4}% |
| 400 | He Chengtian | 111035/35329 | 3.142885... | 2 | +0.041% |
| 480 | Zu Chongzhi | 3.1415926 < π < 3.1415927; 355/113 | 3.1415926 | **7** | 0+1.477 × 10^{−6}% −1.706 × 10^{−6}% +8.480×10^{−6}% |
| 499 | Aryabhata | 62832/20000 | 3.1416 | 3 | −2.338×10^{−4}% |
| 640 | Brahmagupta | √10 | 3.162277... | 1 | +0.658% |
| 800 | Al Khwarizmi | | 3.1416 | 3 | −2.338×10^{−4}% |
| 1150 | Bhāskara II | 3927/1250 and 754/240 | 3.1416 | 3 | −2.338×10^{−4}% |
| 1220 | Fibonacci | | 3.141818 | 3 | +0.007% |
| 1320 | Zhao Youqin | Zhao Youqin's π algorithm | 3.141592 | 6 | −2.080×10^{−5}% |

== 1400–1949 ==
| Date | Who | Note | Decimal places (world records in bold) |
|---|---|---|---|
All records from 1400 onwards are given as the number of correct decimal places.
| 1400 | Madhava of Sangamagrama | Discovered the infinite power series expansion of π now known as the Leibniz formula for pi | **10** |
| 1424 | Jamshīd al-Kāshī | | **16** |
| Around 1500 | Kerala School | Recorded using Katapayadi number system 3.1415926535897932384626433832792 | **31** |
| 1573 | Valentinus Otho | 355/113 | 6 |
| 1579 | François Viète | | 9 |
| 1593 | Adriaan van Roomen | | 15 |
| 1596 | Ludolph van Ceulen | | 20 |
| 1615 | Ludolph van Ceulen | | **32** |
| 1621 | Willebrord Snell (Snellius) | Pupil of Van Ceulen | **35** |
| 1630 | Christoph Grienberger | | **38** |
| 1654 | Christiaan Huygens | Used a geometrical method equivalent to Richardson extrapolation | 10 |
| 1665 | Isaac Newton | | 16 |
| 1681 | Takakazu Seki | | 11; 16 |
| 1699 | Abraham Sharp | Calculated pi to 72 digits, but not all were correct | **71** |
| 1706 | John Machin | | **100** |
| 1706 | William Jones | Introduced the Greek letter 'π' | |
| 1719 | Thomas Fantet de Lagny | Calculated 127 decimal places, but not all were correct | **112** |
| 1721 | Anonymous | Calculation made in Philadelphia, Pennsylvania, giving the value of pi to 154 digits, 152 of which were correct. First discovered by F. X. von Zach in a library in Oxford, England in the 1780s, and reported to Jean-Étienne Montucla, who published an account of it. | **152** |
| 1722 | Toshikiyo Kamata | | 24 |
| 1722 | Katahiro Takebe | | 41 |
| 1739 | Yoshisuke Matsunaga | | 51 |
| 1748 | Leonhard Euler | Used the Greek letter 'π' in his book Introductio in Analysin Infinitorum and assured its popularity. | |
| 1761 | Johann Heinrich Lambert | Proved that π is irrational | |
| 1775 | Euler | Pointed out the possibility that π might be transcendental | |
| 1789 | Jurij Vega | Calculated 140 decimal places, but not all were correct | 126 |
| 1794 | Adrien-Marie Legendre | Showed that π^{2} (and hence π) is irrational, and mentioned the possibility that π might be transcendental. | |
| 1824 | William Rutherford | Calculated 208 decimal places, but not all were correct | 152 |
| 1844 | Zacharias Dase and Strassnitzky | Calculated 205 decimal places, but not all were correct | **200** |
| 1847 | Thomas Clausen | Calculated 250 decimal places, but not all were correct | **248** |
| 1853 | Lehmann | | **261** |
| 1853 | Rutherford | | **440** |
| 1853 | William Shanks | Expanded his calculation to 707 decimal places in 1873, but an error introduced at the beginning of his new calculation rendered all of the subsequent digits invalid (the error was found by D. F. Ferguson in 1946). | **527** |
| 1882 | Ferdinand von Lindemann | Proved that π is transcendental (the Lindemann–Weierstrass theorem) | |
| 1897 | The U.S. state of Indiana | Came close to legislating the value 3.2 (among others) for π. House Bill No. 246 passed unanimously. The bill stalled in the state Senate due to a suggestion of possible commercial motives involving publication of a textbook. | 0 |
| 1910 | Srinivasa Ramanujan | Found several rapidly converging infinite series of π, which can compute 8 decimal places of π with each term in the series. Since the 1980s, his series have become the basis for the fastest algorithms currently used to compute π. | |
| 1946 | D. F. Ferguson | Made use of a desk calculator | **620** |
| 1947 | Ivan Niven | Gave a very elementary proof that π is irrational | |
| January 1947 | D. F. Ferguson | Made use of a desk calculator | **710** |
| September 1947 | D. F. Ferguson | Made use of a desk calculator | **808** |
| 1949 | Levi B. Smith and John Wrench | Made use of a desk calculator | **1,120** |

== 1949–2009 ==
| Date | Who | Implementation | Time | Decimal places (world records in bold) |
|---|---|---|---|---|
All records from 1949 onwards were calculated with electronic computers.
| September 1949 | G. W. Reitwiesner et al. | The first to use an electronic computer (the ENIAC) to calculate π | 70 hours | **2,037** |
| 1953 | Kurt Mahler | Showed that π is not a Liouville number | | |
| 1954 | S. C. Nicholson & J. Jeenel | Using the NORC | 13 minutes | **3,093** |
| 1957 | George E. Felton | Ferranti Pegasus computer (London), calculated 10,021 digits, but not all were correct | 33 hours | **7,480** |
| January 1958 | Francois Genuys | IBM 704 | 1.7 hours | **10,000** |
| May 1958 | George E. Felton | Pegasus computer (London) | 33 hours | **10,021** |
| 1959 | Francois Genuys | IBM 704 (Paris) | 4.3 hours | **16,167** |
| 1961 | Daniel Shanks and John Wrench | IBM 7090 (New York) | 8.7 hours | **100,265** |
| 1961 | J.M. Gerard | IBM 7090 (London) | 39 minutes | 20,000 |
| February 1966 | Jean Guilloud and J. Filliatre | IBM 7030 (Paris) | 41.92 hours | **250,000** |
| 1967 | Jean Guilloud and M. Dichampt | CDC 6600 (Paris) | 28 hours | **500,000** |
| 1973 | Jean Guilloud and Martine Bouyer | CDC 7600 | 23.3 hours | **1,001,250** |
| 1981 | Kazunori Miyoshi and Yasumasa Kanada | FACOM M-200 | 137.3 hours | **2,000,036** |
| 1981 | Jean Guilloud | Not known | | **2,000,050** |
| 1982 | Yoshiaki Tamura | MELCOM 900II | 7.23 hours | **2,097,144** |
| 1982 | Yoshiaki Tamura and Yasumasa Kanada | HITAC M-280H | 2.9 hours | **4,194,288** |
| 1982 | Yoshiaki Tamura and Yasumasa Kanada | HITAC M-280H | 6.86 hours | **8,388,576** |
| May 1983 | Yasumasa Kanada, Sayaka Yoshino and Yoshiaki Tamura | HITAC M-280H | <30 hours | **16,777,206** |
| October 1983 | Yasunori Ushiro and Yasumasa Kanada | HITAC S-810/20 | | 10,013,395 |
| October 1985 | Bill Gosper | Symbolics 3670 | | **17,526,200** |
| January 1986 | David H. Bailey | CRAY-2 | 28 hours | **29,360,111** |
| September 1986 | Yasumasa Kanada, Yoshiaki Tamura | HITAC S-810/20 | 6.6 hours | **33,554,414** |
| October 1986 | Yasumasa Kanada, Yoshiaki Tamura | HITAC S-810/20 | 23 hours | **67,108,839** |
| January 1987 | Yasumasa Kanada, Yoshiaki Tamura, Yoshinobu Kubo and others | NEC SX-2 | 35.25 hours | **134,214,700** |
| January 1988 | Yasumasa Kanada and Yoshiaki Tamura | HITAC S-820/80 | 5.95 hours | **201,326,551** |
| May 1989 | Gregory V. Chudnovsky & David V. Chudnovsky | CRAY-2 & IBM 3090/VF | | **480,000,000** |
| June 1989 | Gregory V. Chudnovsky & David V. Chudnovsky | IBM 3090 | | **535,339,270** |
| 13 July 1989 | Yasumasa Kanada and Yoshiaki Tamura | HITAC S-820/80 | | **536,870,898** |
| August 1989 | Gregory V. Chudnovsky & David V. Chudnovsky | IBM 3090 | | **1,011,196,691** |
| 19 November 1989 | Yasumasa Kanada and Yoshiaki Tamura | HITAC S-820/80 | | **1,073,740,799** |
| August 1991 | Gregory V. Chudnovsky & David V. Chudnovsky | Homemade parallel computer (details unknown, not verified) | | **2,260,000,000** |
| 18 May 1994 | Gregory V. Chudnovsky & David V. Chudnovsky | New homemade parallel computer (details unknown, not verified) | | **4,044,000,000** |
| 26 June 1995 | Yasumasa Kanada and Daisuke Takahashi | HITAC S-3800/480 (dual CPU) | | 3,221,220,000 |
| 1995 | Simon Plouffe | Finds a formula that allows the nth hexadecimal digit of pi to be calculated without calculating the preceding digits. | | |
| 28 August 1995 | Yasumasa Kanada and Daisuke Takahashi | HITAC S-3800/480 (dual CPU) | 56.74 hours? | **4,294,960,000** |
| 11 October 1995 | Yasumasa Kanada and Daisuke Takahashi | HITAC S-3800/480 (dual CPU) | 116.63 hours | **6,442,450,000** |
| 6 July 1997 | Yasumasa Kanada and Daisuke Takahashi | HITACHI SR2201 (1024 CPU) | 29.05 hours | **51,539,600,000** |
| 5 April 1999 | Yasumasa Kanada and Daisuke Takahashi | HITACHI SR8000 (64 of 128 nodes) | 32.9 hours | **68,719,470,000** |
| 20 September 1999 | Yasumasa Kanada and Daisuke Takahashi | HITACHI SR8000/MPP (128 nodes) | 37.35 hours | **206,158,430,000** |
| 24 November 2002 | Yasumasa Kanada & 9 man team | HITACHI SR8000/MPP (64 nodes), Department of Information Science at the University of Tokyo in Tokyo, Japan | 600 hours | **1,241,100,000,000** |
| 29 April 2009 | Daisuke Takahashi et al. | T2K Open Supercomputer (640 nodes), single node speed is 147.2 gigaflops, computer memory is 13.5 terabytes, Gauss–Legendre algorithm, Center for Computational Sciences at the University of Tsukuba in Tsukuba, Japan | 29.09 hours | **2,576,980,377,524** |

== 2009–present ==
| Date | Who | Implementation | Time | Decimal places (world records in bold) |
|---|---|---|---|---|
All records from Dec 2009 onwards are calculated and verified on commodity x86 computers with commercially available parts. All use the Chudnovsky algorithm for the main computation, and Bellard's formula, the Bailey–Borwein–Plouffe formula, or both for verification.
| 31 December 2009 | Fabrice Bellard | Computation: Intel Core i7 @ 2.93 GHz (4 cores, 6 GiB DDR3-1066 RAM); Storage: 7.5 TB (5× 1.5 TB); Red Hat Fedora 10 (x64); Computation of the binary digits (Chudnovsky algorithm): 103 days; Verification of the binary digits (Bellard's formula): 13 days; Conversion to base 10: 12 days; Verification of the conversion: 3 days; Verification of the binary digits used a network of 9 Desktop PCs during 34 hours. | 131 days | **2,699,999,990,000** = 2.7×10^{12} − 10^{4} |
| 2 August 2010 | Shigeru Kondo | using y-cruncher 0.5.4 by Alexander Yee; with 2× Intel Xeon X5680 @ 3.33 GHz – (12 physical cores, 24 hyperthreaded); 96 GiB DDR3 @ 1066 MHz – (12× 8 GiB – 6 channels) – Samsung (M393B1K70BH1); 1 TB SATA II (Boot drive) – Hitachi (HDS721010CLA332), 3× 2 TB SATA II (Store Pi Output) – Seagate (ST32000542AS) 16× 2 TB SATA II (Computation) – Seagate (ST32000641AS); Windows Server 2008 R2 Enterprise (x64); Computation of binary digits: 80 days; Conversion to base 10: 8.2 days; Verification of the conversion: 45.6 hours; Verification of the binary digits: 64 hours (Bellard formula), 66 hours (BBP formula); Verification of the binary digits were done simultaneously on two separate computers during the main computation. Both computed 32 hexadecimal digits ending with the 4,152,410,118,610th. | 90 days | **5,000,000,000,000** = 5×10^{12} |
| 17 October 2011 | Shigeru Kondo | using y-cruncher 0.5.5; with 2× Intel Xeon X5680 @ 3.33 GHz – (12 physical cores, 24 hyperthreaded); 96 GiB DDR3 @ 1066 MHz – (12× 8 GiB – 6 channels) – Samsung (M393B1K70BH1); 1 TB SATA II (Boot drive) – Hitachi (HDS721010CLA332), 5× 2 TB SATA II (Store Pi Output), 24× 2 TB SATA II (Computation); Windows Server 2008 R2 Enterprise (x64); Verification: 1.86 days (Bellard formula) and 4.94 days (BBP formula) | 371 days | **10,000,000,000,050** = 10^{13} + 50 |
| 28 December 2013 | Shigeru Kondo | using y-cruncher 0.6.3; Computation: 2× Intel Xeon E5-2690 @ 2.9 GHz – (32 cores, 128 GiB DDR3-1600 RAM); Storage: 97 TB (32× 3 TB, 1× 1 TB); Windows Server 2012 (x64); Verification using Bellard's formula: 46 hours | 94 days | **12,100,000,000,050** = 1.21×10^{13} + 50 |
| 8 October 2014 | Sandon Nash Van Ness "houkouonchi" | using y-cruncher 0.6.3; Computation: 2× Xeon E5-4650L @ 2.6 GHz (16 cores, 192 GiB DDR3-1333 RAM); Storage: 186 TB (24× 4 TB + 30× 3 TB); Verification using Bellard's formula: 182 hours | 208 days | **13,300,000,000,000** = 1.33×10^{13} |
| 11 November 2016 | Peter Trueb | using y-cruncher 0.7.1; Computation: 4× Xeon E7-8890 v3 @ 2.50 GHz (72 cores, 1.25 TiB DDR4 RAM); Storage: 120 TB (20× 6 TB); Linux (x64); Verification using Bellard's formula: 28 hours | 105 days | **22,459,157,718,361** = ⌊π^{e}×10^{12}⌋ |
| 14 March 2019 | Emma Haruka Iwao | using y-cruncher v0.7.6; Computation: 1× n1-megamem-96 (96 vCPU, 1.4 TB) with 30 TB of SSD; Storage: 24× n1-standard-16 (16 vCPU, 60 GB) with 10 TB of SSD; Windows Server 2016 (x64); Verification: 20 hours using Bellard's 7-term formula, and 28 hours using Plouffe's 4-term formula | 121 days | **31,415,926,535,897** = ⌊π×10^{13}⌋ |
| 29 January 2020 | Timothy Mullican | using y-cruncher v0.7.7; Computation: 4× Intel Xeon CPU E7-4880 v2 @ 2.5 GHz (60 cores, 320 GB DDR3-1066 RAM); Storage: 406.5 TB – 48× 6 TB HDDs (Computation) + 47× LTO Ultrium 5 1.5 TB Tapes (Checkpoint Backups) + 12× 4 TB HDDs (Digit Storage); Ubuntu 18.10 (x64); Verification: 17 hours using Bellard's 7-term formula, 24 hours using Plouffe's 4-term formula | 303 days | **50,000,000,000,000** = 5×10^{13} |
| 14 August 2021 | Team DAViS of the University of Applied Sciences of the Grisons | using y-cruncher v0.7.8; Computation: AMD Epyc 7542 @ 2.9 GHz (32 cores, 1 TiB RAM); Storage: 608 TB (38× 16 TB HDDs, 34 are used for swapping and 4 used for storage); Ubuntu 20.04 (x64); Verification using the 4-term BBP formula: 34 hours | 108 days | **62,831,853,071,796** = ⌈2π×10^{13}⌉ |
| 21 March 2022 | Emma Haruka Iwao | using y-cruncher v0.7.8; Computation: n2-highmem-128 (128 vCPU and 864 GB RAM); Storage: 663 TB; Debian Linux 11 (x64); Verification: 12.6 hours using BBP formula | 158 days | **100,000,000,000,000** = 10^{14} |
| 18 April 2023 | Jordan Ranous | using y-cruncher v0.7.10; Computation: 2× AMD EPYC 9654 @ 2.4 GHz (96 cores, 1.5 TiB DDR5-4800 RAM); Storage: 583 TB (19× 30.72 TB); Windows Server 2022 (x64) | 59 days | 100,000,000,000,000 = 10^{14} |
| 14 March 2024 | Jordan Ranous, Kevin O’Brien and Brian Beeler | using y-cruncher v0.8.3; Computation: 2× AMD EPYC 9754 @ 2.25 GHz (128 cores, 1.5 TiB DDR5 RAM); Storage: 1,105 TB (36× 30.72 TB); Windows Server 2022 (x64) | 75 days | **105,000,000,000,000** = 1.05×10^{14} |
| 28 June 2024 | Jordan Ranous, Kevin O’Brien and Brian Beeler | using y-cruncher v0.8.3; Computation: 2× Intel Xeon Platinum 8592+ @ 1.9 GHz (128 cores, 1.0 TiB DDR5 RAM); Storage: 1.5 PB (28× 61.44 TB); Windows 10 (x64) | 104 days | **202,112,290,000,000** = 2.0211229×10^{14} |
| 2 April 2025 | Linus Media Group, Kioxia | using y-cruncher v0.8.5; Computation: 2× AMD EPYC 9684X 3D V-Cache @ 2.55GHz (192 cores, 3.0 TiB DDR5 RAM); Storage: 2.2 PB (80× 15.36TB + 32× 30.72TB); Ubuntu 24.04 (x64) | 226 days | **300,000,000,000,000** = 3×10^{14} |
| 23 November 2025 | Kevin O'Brien, Divyansh Jain, Brian Beeler | using y-cruncher v0.8.6; Computation: 2× AMD EPYC 9965 @ 2.25GHz (192 cores, 1.5 TiB DDR5 RAM); Storage: 2.4 PB (40× 61.44TB); Ubuntu 24.04 (x64) | 110 days | **314,000,000,000,000** = 3.14×10^{14} |

== See also ==
- History of pi
- Approximations of pi
