= Naoki Saito (mathematician) =

Japanese mathematician

- Education: University of Tokyo, Yale University
- Scientific career
- Fields: Applied Mathematics
- Workplaces: University of California, Davis
- Doctoral advisor: Ronald Coifman

Naoki Saito is an applied mathematician specializing in applied and computational harmonic analysis, and interested in feature extraction, pattern recognition, graph signal processing, statistical signal processing, Laplacian eigenfunctions, and human and machine perception.

== Education ==
Saito studied at the University of Tokyo, receiving his BEng in 1982 and his MEng in 1984. He joined Nippon Schlumberger K.K. in 1984, and in 1986 moved to Schlumberger-Doll Research (SDR), Ridgefield, Connecticut, where he was a research scientist. He continued his studies, receiving his PhD in applied mathematics from Yale University in 1994.

== Career ==
Saito began teaching at the Department of Mathematics at the University of California, Davis in 1997, where he is currently a distinguished professor and a director of the UC Davis TETRAPODS Institute of Data Science, one of National Science Foundation's Transdisciplinary Research In Principles Of Data Science (TRIPODS) Institutes, which brings together the theoretical computer science, electrical engineering, mathematics, and statistics communities to develop the theoretical foundations of data science. He was also Chair of the Graduate Group in Applied Mathematics at UC Davis from 2007 to 2012. He is a senior member of IEEE as well as a member of IMS, SIAM, and JSIAM.

He served as Chair of the SIAM Activity Group on Imaging Science from 2013 to 2015, and is a member of the editorial board of Applied and Computational Harmonic Analysis, Inverse Problems and Imaging, and Journal of Mathematical Imaging and Vision.

Saito received the Best Paper Awards from the SPIE (1994), and JSIAM (2016) as well as the Henri Doll Award from Schlumberger (1997), Young Investigator Award from the ONR (2000), and the Presidential Early Career Award for Scientists and Engineers (PECASE) (2000).

Saito has contributed to a number of notable interdisciplinary projects including the development of a noninvasive fetal oxygen monitor as well as the Lake Tahoe Sonification Project in 2014.
