= Daisuke Takahashi (disambiguation) =

Daisuke Takahashi (髙橋 大輔, born 1986) is a Japanese figure skater.

Daisuke Takahashi may also refer to:

- Daisuke Takahashi (footballer) (高橋 大輔, born 1983), Japanese footballer
- Daisuke Takahashi (mathematician), Japanese mathematician
- Daisuke Takahashi (高橋 大輔, born 1986), Japanese voice actor
