= Zhao Youqin =

Chinese mathematician (born 1271)

- Born: July 26, 1271; Jiangxi province
- Died: Jiming mountain, Zhejiang Province
- Organization: Quanzhen School of Song-Yuan Daoism
- Notable work: Ge xiang xin shu

Zhao Youqin (趙友欽 1271-?) was a Chinese mathematician, astronomer, alchemist, and Taoist monk. He is most well known for his book Ge xiang xin shu (革象新书), translated either as New Elucidation of the Heavenly Bodies or New Writing on the Image of Alteration, wherein he described a new method to calculate pi.

== Biography ==
Zhao was born on July 26, 1271. Most information about Zhao comes from three, slightly conflicting, sources: a Daoist biography Shangyangzi jindan dayao liexianzhi by Chen Zhixu, and two biographies in different editions of Zhao's own book Ge xiang xin shu (革象新书), one written by Wang Wei and the other by Song Lian (宋濂). All biographies agree that Zhao was gifted in astronomy from a young age and that he was born in Jiangxi province.

The Shangyangzi jindan dayao says that, as a child, he was injured during the war between Mongol leader Kublai Khan and the Song dynasty. Zhixu's biography says that Zhao was a Daoist hermit, and later a patriarch of the Quanzhen (Complete Perfection) School of Song-Yuan Daoism. He ordained the next patriarch, Chen Zhixu (who wrote the Daoist biography mentioned above), in 1329. The Shangyangzi jindan dayao does not mention a date of death for him, suggesting he was alive when it was written between 1331 and 1335.

Song Lian's biography agrees that Zhao was a Daoist hermit, claiming that he spent either 10 or 20 years writing a commentary on the Book of Changes (Yi jing) after obtaining a secret book on alchemy from an immortal Daoist master. However, this commentary has been lost. The biography further claims that Zhao gave a manuscript of Ge xiang xin shu to his disciple, Zhu Hui, while on his deathbed on Jiming mountain in the Zhejiang Province. This manuscript was later published by Zhu's disciple, Zhang Jun. The Jiangxi tongzhi states he died after 1368. This is not widely accepted as this would make him 97 at the time of death.

== Discoveries/Theories ==
Zhao's most notable work is Ge xiang xin shu (革象新书), in which he discussed geometry, astronomy, and optics. He is most well-known for his method of finding pi by drawing a square and increasing the number of sides until it resembles a circle using iterative methods, then finding the perimeter (circumference) of the shape (a circle, or close to it). The book contains a section, "Qian xiang zhou bi" ("On Circumference and Diameter of the Symbol of Heaven"), where Zhao lists pairs of values of circumferences and diameters used to calculate pi in the past; he believed 355/113 to be the most accurate. Liu Hui had already discovered a method for finding pi, and Zu Chongzhi had stated that pi was between 3.1415926 and 3.1415927, but Zhao's method allowed for this to be proven. Zhao's method involved finding the perimeter of a 16384-sided polygon. A 2048-sided polygon would have sufficiently proved pi is near 355/113, however it is believed he was trying to prove that it was within Zu Chongzhi’s interval, thus the need for 16384 sides. Zhao also claimed that the value of pi could never be exhaustively calculated. While the work is influential, it does not note all of the values to enough decimal places to get some of the results, and has been known to underestimate values (but says that there is some remainder).

Zhao also described the structure of the universe as a flat Earth inside spherical heavens. He used the metaphor of a healthy and sick horse to describe the motions of the sun and moon. He labels the healthy horse as the sun and the unhealthy horse as the moon, and says that each starts at the same point and runs around a circle before noting how far the moon falls behind. This exercise found the moon to be slower than the sun. Additionally, it used a circular track, concerning angular distances, as opposed to considering a straight track. He also described an instrument used to calculate the angle between a star and the North Pole, and another used to find the differences in the right ascension of two celestial objects.

In Ge xiang xin shu (革象新书), Zhao described an optical experiment he undertook in a chapter titled "Pinhole Image". In the experiment, he had two light sources - tables with candles on them - which he covered with a board with a hole in the center, and observed the light as it passed through the hole onto a screen above. In doing so, he found that a larger hole let more light through; more candles led to a brighter image; the shape of the image on the screen is independent of the shape and size of the pinhole; and that moving the screen further away led to a dimmer image.

Zhao has another extant book, Xian Fo tongyuan, dedicated to becoming immortal using meditation through "Inner Alchemy." He also wrote at least two Daoist books, Xian Fo tong yuan [lun] ([A Discourse] on the Common Origins of [the Teachings of] Immortals and Buddhas) and Jin dan nan wen (Difficult Problems of Gold Cinnabar).

== Works ==
- Ge xiang xin shu (革象新书)
- Xian Fo tongyuan
- Xian Fo tong yuan [lun] ([A Discourse] on the Common Origins of [the Teachings of] Immortals and Buddhas)
- Jin dan nan wen (Difficult Problems of Gold Cinnabar) (no known extant copy)
