= Fangcheng =

Fangcheng may refer to:

== Places in China ==
- Fangcheng County (方城县), of Nanyang, Henan
- Fangcheng District (防城区), Fangchenggang, Guangxi
  - Fangcheng, Fangchenggang (防城镇), town in and seat of Fangcheng District
- Fangcheng, Linyi (方城镇), town in Lanshan District, Linyi, Shandong
- Fangcheng, Xintai (放城镇), town in Shandong

== Other ==
- Fangcheng (mathematics), the eighth Chapter of the Chinese mathematical classic Jiuzhang suanshu (The Nine Chapters on the Mathematical Art)
- Fangcheng Fellowship, a Christian religious movement in China
