= Emma Haruka Iwao =

Japanese computer scientist (born 1984)

- 岩尾エマはるか
- Born: April 21, 1984 (age 42); Kaizuka, Osaka, Japan
- Education: University of Tsukuba
- Awards: Guinness World Record for most accurate value of pi (π) in 2019 and 2022
- Scientific career
- Fields: Computer science
- Workplaces: Google; Panasonic; GREE; Red Hat
- Website: blog.yuryu.jp

Emma Haruka Iwao (born April 21, 1984) is a Japanese computer scientist and cloud developer advocate at Google. In 2019 Haruka Iwao calculated the then world record for most accurate value of pi (π); which included 31.4 trillion digits, exceeding the previous record of 22 trillion. This record was surpassed in 2020 by Timothy Mullican who calculated 50 trillion digits, but she reclaimed the record in 2022 with 100 trillion digits. The record was surpassed by a computer storage company in 2024, reaching roughly 105 trillion digits. She identifies as queer.

== Early life and education ==
As a child, Iwao became interested in pi, learning of the record-breaking computations of her Japanese compatriots Daisuke Takahashi and Yasumasa Kanada. She studied computer science at the University of Tsukuba, where she was taught by Takahashi. She was awarded the Dean's Award for Excellence in 2008, before starting graduate studies in computing. Her master's thesis considered high performance computer systems. After graduating, Iwao took on several software engineering positions, working on site reliability for Panasonic, GREE and Red Hat.

== Career ==
Iwao joined Google as a Cloud Developer Advocate in 2015. She originally worked for Google in Tokyo, before moving to Seattle in 2019. Iwao offers training in the use of the Google Cloud Platform (GCP), as well as supporting application developers. She works to make cloud computing accessible for everyone, creating online demos and teaching materials.

In March 2019 Iwao calculated the value of pi to 31,415,926,535,897 digits (equal to ⌊π × 10^{13}⌋), using 170 terabytes (TB) of data. The calculation used a multithreaded program called y-cruncher using over 25 machines for 121 days. This was the first time the record had been set using a cloud computing service, and was achieved at a cost of roughly US$200,000.

In March 2022 she extended the world record to 100 trillion digits of pi.

== See also ==
- Chronology of computation of π
