= Ronald Coifman =

Israeli mathematician

- רונלד קויפמן
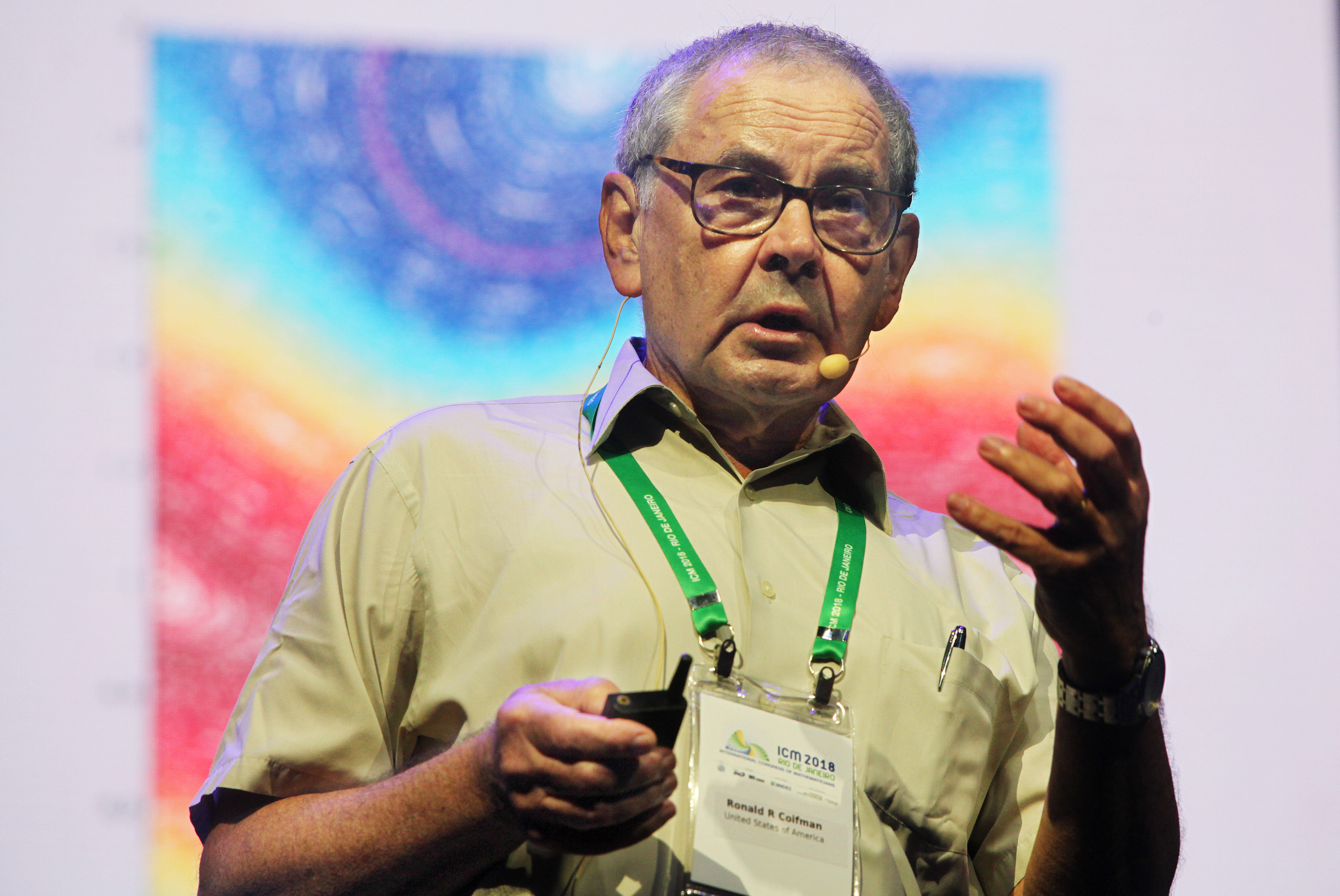
- Coifman at the ICM 2018
- Born: June 29, 1941 (age 85); Tel Aviv, Israel
- Education: University of Geneva
- Awards: National Medal of Science (1999); Rolf Schock Prize (2018)
- Scientific career
- Fields: Mathematics
- Workplaces: Yale University; Washington University in St. Louis; University of Chicago
- Doctoral advisor: Jovan Karamata
- Doctoral students: Victor Wickerhauser; Sijue Wu; Andrea Nahmod; Naoki Saito; Christoph Thiele

Ronald Raphael Coifman (Hebrew: רונלד קויפמן; born June 29, 1941) is a Sterling professor of Mathematics at Yale University. Coifman earned a doctorate from the University of Geneva in 1965, supervised by Jovan Karamata.

Coifman is a member of the American Academy of Arts and Sciences, the Connecticut Academy of Science and Engineering, and the National Academy of Sciences. He is a recipient of the 1996 DARPA Sustained Excellence Award, the 1996 Connecticut Science Medal, the 1999 Pioneer Award of the International Society for Industrial and Applied Science, and the 1999 National Medal of Science.

Prior to teaching at Yale, Coifman taught at Washington University in St. Louis and the University of Chicago.

In 2013, he co-founded ThetaRay, a cyber security and big data analytics company.

In 2018, he received the Rolf Schock Prize for Mathematics. In 2024 he was awarded the George David Birkhoff Prize.
