= ThetaRay =

Cyber security and data analytics company

- Type: Private
- Industry: Big data analytics
- Founded: 2013; 13 years ago
- Founders: Amir Averbuch; Ronald Coifman; Mark Gazit
- Headquarters: Hod HaSharon, Israel
- Products: anti-money-laundering transaction monitoring software
- Website: www.thetaray.com

ThetaRay is a fintech software and big data analytics company with headquarters in Hod HaSharon, Israel and New York, and offices in Madrid, London, and Singapore.

The company provides AI-powered SaaS and on-premises anti-money-laundering (AML) transaction monitoring and sanctions screening software for banks, fintechs, and government Financial Intelligence Units (FIUs).

The platform is also used to uncover unknown opportunities based on big data. The company utilizes patented mathematical algorithms developed by the company founders.

== History ==
ThetaRay was founded in 2013 by Amir Averbuch and Ronald Coifman. Averbuch is a professor of computer science at Tel Aviv University with a main research focus on big data processing and analysis. Coifman is a professor of mathematics at Yale University and recipient of the 1999 National Medal of Science. His main research focus is on efficient computation and numerical analysis. Mark Gazit, an international security expert and serial startup entrepreneur, is co-founder and CEO of ThetaRay.

In June 2013, ThetaRay raised its seed funding from Jerusalem Venture Partners (JVP) as part of their cybersecurity portfolio. Two months later, General Electric (GE) joined JVP as an investor and ThetaRay launched its Advanced Analytics Platform for big data. It was followed by operational risk solutions for financial organizations in April 2015. In July 2015, ThetaRay opened an office in New York, and two months later launched its Credit Risk Detection Model for online lending. In December 2015, ThetaRay and PricewaterhouseCoopers signed a Joint Business Relations agreement. ThetaRay has customers such as ING Group that purchased ThetaRay’s Advanced Analytics solution for fraud detection. ThetaRay opened an office in Singapore in July 2016.

Version 4.0 of ThetaRay’s flagship product, released in July 2019, included major capability upgrades to help global banks detect and prevent financial crime[NG1] based on its powerful AI, replicating the powerful decision-making capabilities of human intuition to detect "unknown unknowns" that cannot be identified by first-generation AI or legacy products.

In late 2019, Banco Santander began implementing ThetaRay’s solution to detect money laundering in cross-border payments, signing an agreement in June 2020 to operate the AML system in its branches.

In April 2021, ThetaRay launched SONAR, a cloud-native SaaS version of its AML solution for transaction monitoring.

In May 2021, ThetaRay raised $31 million in a Series C round, bringing to some $100 million the total investment in the company, by the following key investors: Jerusalem Venture Partners, OurCrowd, Saints Ventures, Benhamou Global Ventures, and Bank Hapoalim.

== Awards ==
- Winner of the 2014 Red Herring Top 100 Award, sector Security
- Winner of the 2014 TiE50 Award
- Winner of the 2014 Global Frost & Sullivan Entrepreneurial Company of the Year Award
- Named Gartner Cool Vendor in Security for Technology and Service Providers, 2015
- Winner of 2022 FinTech Breakthrough Award for Best AML Solution.
- Winner of the 2022 CrossTech Innovation Award for Compliance Solution of the Year.

== See also ==
- Big Data
- Artificial Intelligence
- Anti-money-laundering software
