= Tsu Chung-Chi (crater) =

Crater on the Moon

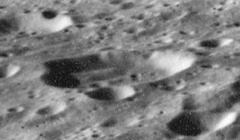
- Oblique Apollo 16 image, facing east
- Coordinates: 17.3°N 145.1°E
- Diameter: 28 km
- Depth: Unknown
- Colongitude: 215° at sunrise
- Eponym: Zu Chongzhi

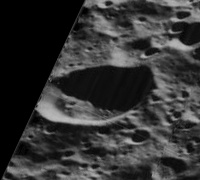
Oblique Lunar Orbiter 5 image

Tsu Chung-Chi is a relatively small lunar impact crater on the Moon's far side. It lies to the west-southwest of the crater Leonov, and to the northeast of the large walled plain called Mendeleev. To the north of Tsu Chung-Chi is the Mare Moscoviense, one of the few maria on the Moon's far side.

This is a bowl-shaped crater formation that is slightly elongated to the northwest. It has undergone some erosion, with a small, cup-shaped crater intruding slightly into the southern rim and several tiny craterlets within the interior. The inner walls are simple slopes down to the interior floor. This crater is otherwise undistinguished.

This feature - one of the about 500 features identified on the photographs of the far side of the Moon made by Luna 3 in 1959 - was named after the Chinese mathematician and astronomer Zu Chongzhi. According to the memoirs of Boris Chertok, who was closely involved with the Luna 3 mission, some fairly complicated politics was involved in picking the name:

Finally, the Keldysh Commission received a go-ahead, and obtained a decision of the Praesidium of the Academy to name the craters after prominent scientists and cultural figures: Giordano Bruno, Jules Verne, Hertz, Kurchatov, Lobachevsky, Maxwell, Mendeleev, Pasteur, Popov, Skłodowska-Curie, Zu Chongzhi and Edison.

As reported by "reliable sources", the most controversial figure was Zu Chongzhi. This 5th-century mathematician was said to be famous in China, but none of my mathematician friends was able to explain what he was famous for. But we could not offend China, a great and friendly country. Central Committee's instructions demanded that the list included an American and a Chinese. It was easy to pick an American - everyone was fine with Edison. But concerning the Chinese, I was told that we had to consult with the embassy, which, in its turn, sent a request to Beijing.

== Satellite craters ==
By convention these features are identified on lunar maps by placing the letter on the side of the crater midpoint that is closest to Tsu Chung-Chi.

Tsu Chung-Chi	Latitude	Longitude	Diameter
W	18.5° N	143.3° E	24 km

== See also ==
- Zu Chong-Zhi is also the name of asteroid 1964 VO1; see also 1888 Zu Chong-Zhi.
