= Hugh McGregor Ross =

British computer scientist

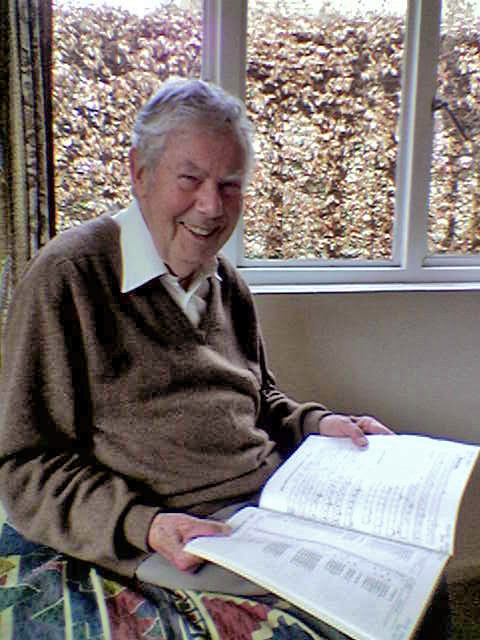
- Hugh McGregor Ross, 88 years of age when the photo was taken in January 2006, with a copy of the 1987 Draft Proposal for ISO/IEC 10646
- Born: Hugh McGregor Ross; 31 August 1917; Nairobi, British East Africa
- Died: 1 September 2014 (aged 97); Painswick, Gloucestershire, England
- Occupation: computer scientist
- Known for: early work as a computer pioneer, standardization of ASCII
- Website: www.gospelofthomas.info

Hugh McGregor Ross (31 August 1917 – 1 September 2014) was an early pioneer in the history of British computing. He was employed by Ferranti from the mid-1960s, where he worked on the Pegasus thermionic valve computer. He was involved in the standardization of ASCII and ISO 646 and worked closely with Bob Bemer. ASCII was first known in Europe as the Bemer–Ross Code. He was also one of the four main designers of ISO 6937, with Peter Fenwick, Bernard Marti and Loek Zeckendorf. He was one of the principal architects of the Universal Character Set ISO/IEC 10646 when it was first conceived.

Hugh was an expert in the Gospel of Thomas and wrote several books about it. He was a Quaker, and also wrote about George Fox. His working papers on the teachings of Fox are held at Yorkshire Quaker Heritage Project.

== Books by Hugh McGregor Ross ==
- Hugh McGregor, Ross; and Colleagues (2012), Pegasus: The Early Seminal Computer, Authors Online Ltd, ISBN 978-0755214822
- George Fox Speaks for Himself: Texts that reveal his personality—many hitherto unpublished. York: William Sessions, 1991. ISBN 1-85072-081-9
- Говорит сам Джордж Фокс: тексты, раскрывающие его личнотсь (многие публикуются впервые). Отобрано, отредактировано и представлено Хью Мак-Грегором Россом. Ленинград: [s.n.]. ISBN 5-94067-018-0
- The Gospel of Thomas: newly presented to bring out the meaning, with introductions paraphrases and notes. Colchester: The Millrind Press, 1997. ISBN 1-902194-02-0. Second edition Element Books, ISBN 1-84293-036-2. First edition York: Ebor Press, ISBN 1-85072-019-3
- Jesus untouched by the Church: His Teachings in the Gospel of Thomas. Calligraphy by John Blamires. York: William Sessions Limited, 1998. ISBN 1-85072-213-7
- Thirty Essays on the Gospel of Thomas. Cathair na Mart: Evertype, 2008. ISBN 978-1-904808-12-1. 4th edition Watkins Publishing. ISBN 1-84293-135-0
- George Fox: A Christian mystic. Cathair na Mart: Evertype, 2008. ISBN 978-1-904808-17-6
