= George E. Felton =

British computer scientist (1921–2019)

George Eric Felton
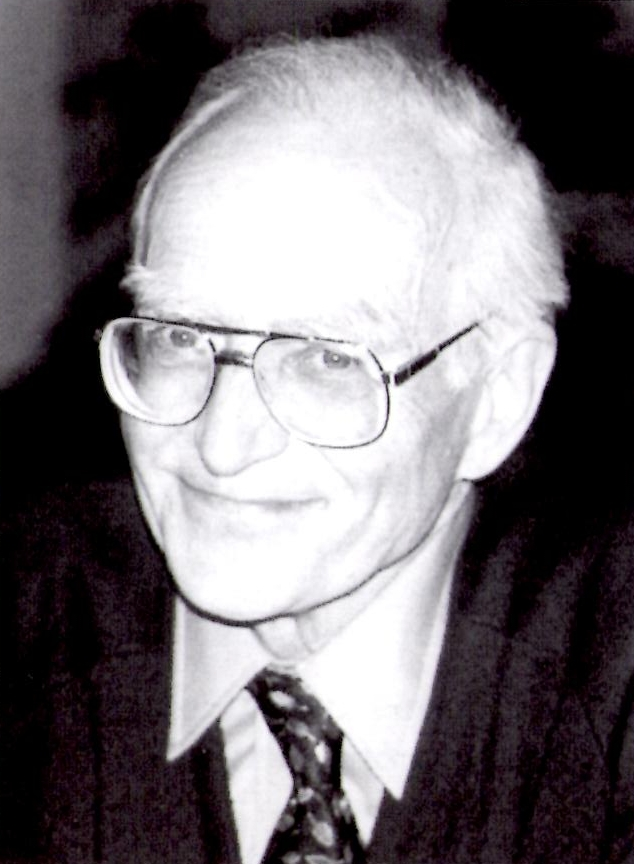
- Eric Felton in 1965
- Born: 3 February 1921; Paris, France
- Died: 14 June 2019 (aged 98)
- Education: Magdalene College, Cambridge
- Employer(s): Elliott Brothers, Ferranti, ICT, ICL
- Known for: Ferranti Pegasus and Orion system software, the GEORGE Operating System
- Spouse: Ruth A. R. Felton (nee Holt)
- Children: Nicholas; Peter; Eric; Matthew
- Relatives: Paul Grice

George Eric Felton (3 February 1921 – 14 June 2019) was a British computer scientist. He undertook pioneering work in the field of operating systems and programming software and is the father of the GEORGE operating system. He held the world record for the computation of π.

== Early life, education, and military service ==
George Felton was born in Paris in 1921 to English parents - his mother, Muriel Felton, worked at Bletchley Park during the war. He was brought up in Paris and Menton but moved to England following the early death of his father. Felton attended Bedford School and Magdalene College, Cambridge where he read the Mathematical Tripos. His university studies were interrupted by World War II during which Felton joined the RAF with a commission. Exploiting his interest in electronics he served as a Radar engineer and instructor. He was demobilised and returned to Cambridge in 1946. At Cambridge he met his wife Ruth Felton at meetings of The Round Country Dance society.

After commencing research in theoretical physics he switched his attention to Numerical Analysis and Programming, spurred on by his close contact with the construction of the EDSAC prototype computer in the Mathematical Laboratory, under Maurice Wilkes.

== Career ==
In 1951 Felton joined Elliott Brothers in Borehamwood where he designed the programming systems and wrote software for the Nicholas and Elliott 402 computers. From mid-1954 at Ferranti's London Computer Centre Felton led the team developing innovative and comprehensive operating system and programming software for the Ferranti Pegasus and Orion computers. Hugh McGregor Ross records that "George Felton tells how, when Pegasus was new, he would borrow a front door key on Friday evenings so he could get in during the weekends. Then, alone in the building, he would start up the computer to sum a series to calculate the value of π to a then record 10,024 decimal places. This was a good test of the reliability of Pegasus". His computations of π were records in their day 1957. (Note: This published result is correct to only 7480D, as was established by Felton in a second calculation, using formula (5), completed in 1958 but apparently unpublished. For a detailed account of calculations of π see J. W. Wrench, Jr., "The evolution of extended decimal approximations to π," The Mathematics Teacher, v. 53, 1960, pp. 644–650.) The team at Ferranti included Bill Elliott, Conway Berners-Lee, Christopher Strachey, Charles Owen, Hugh Devonald, Henry Goodman and Derek Milledge.

The business computing division of Ferranti was merged with International Computers and Tabulators (ICT) in 1963, and ICT was in turn merged with English Electric Leo Marconi (EELM) computers in 1968 to form International Computers Limited (ICL). Following the mergers Felton ran the division responsible for the operating system and basic software for the 1900 Series. The new system was named George, (Note: In "Another ICL Anthology" George Felton explains the origin of the name as follows: "About January 1965, there was a meeting in my office, while I was away abroad, discussing different ways of allotting functions between the proposed operating system and Executive. Scheme A was discussed and rejected. Scheme B ditto. And Schemes C, D, E and F were also discarded in quick succession. When Scheme G came up, everybody was happy, and it was decided to adopt it. The "GEneral ORGanisational Environment' was also quickly formulated as the official expansion of the acronym. But the name 'GEORGE' was in any case a natural choice: it had echoes of aircraft autopilots; it was a bit of fun; and I certainly wasn't going to object".) was based on ideas from the Orion and the spooling system of the Atlas computer.

== Personal life ==
Felton was also a notable photographer. He was a member of the Royal Photographic Society and had regular acceptances in its International Print Exhibition. Examples of his work can be found online at the London Salon of Photography and at Arena Photographers.

He married Ruth A. R. Holt in Cambridge, 1951, and they had 4 sons. One of their sons, Matthew Felton, moved to the United States and became one of the designers of the Microsoft Windows NT operating system. Another son, Eric Felton, worked at ICL on CASE (Computer-Aided Software Engineering) tools.

Felton died in June 2019 at the age of 98.

== Titles, honours, and awards ==
- Fellow of the British Computer Society.
- Fujitsu Gold Medal for Computing
- Fellow of the Royal Photographic Society.
