= Andrea R. Nahmod =

American mathematician

- Born: 1964 (age 61–62)
- Citizenship: United States
- Education: Yale University
- Known for: Nonlinear partial differential equations
- Awards: Fellow of the American Mathematical Society; Simons Foundation Fellow
- Scientific career
- Fields: Mathematics
- Workplaces: University of Massachusetts, Amherst
- Thesis: Geometry of Operators and Spectral Analysis (1991)
- Doctoral advisor: Ronald Coifman

Andrea Rica Nahmod (born 1964) is an American mathematician at University of Massachusetts, Amherst. She is known for her work in nonlinear partial differential equations nonlinear Fourier analysis, and harmonic analysis.

== Eearly Life and Education ==
Nahmod was born in Buenos Aires, Argentina, into a family of physicians and medical researchers.

During her childhood and early university years in Argentina, which coincided with the military dictatorship (1976–1983), she found mathematics to be a source of intellectual stability amid political turmoil. Although she initially intended to study medicine, her interest in the mathematical foundations of genetics and the encouragement of a former neighbor working in astrophysics led her to pursue a career in mathematics.

She earned a Licenciatura en Matemática (equivalent to an M.Sc. in Mathematics) from the Faculty of Exact and Natural Sciences at the University of Buenos Aires. Her Thesis advisor was Cora Sadosky who also helped her pursue her Ph.D in the US.

Nahmod received her Ph.D. from Yale University in 1991 under the supervision of Ronald R. Coifman. She went to work as a research fellow at Macquarie University from 1992 to 1994, followed by positions at University of Texas, Austin, the Mathematical Sciences Research Institute, and the Institute for Advanced Study, before coming to work at University of Massachusetts, Amherst in 1998.

== Career ==
She has organized research programs at institutions including the Mathematical Sciences Research Institute (MSRI) at the University of California, Berkeley, and the Institute for Computational and Experimental Research in Mathematics (ICERM) at Brown University.

== Awards and honors ==
In 2013, Nahmod became a Simons Fellow.

In 2014, Nahmod became a fellow of the American Mathematical Society. The society cited her “contributions to nonlinear Fourier analysis, harmonic analysis, and partial differential equations, as well as service to the mathematical community.”

Nahmod was named MSRI Simons Professor for 2015-2016.

She was also awarded the Sargent-Faul Fellowship at the Radcliffe Institute for Advanced Study and the Chern Professorship.

== Selected publications ==
- Nahmod, Andrea; Stefanov, Atanas; Uhlenbeck, Karen. On Schrödinger maps. Comm. Pure Appl. Math. 56 (2003), no. 1, 114–151.
- Auscher, Pascal; McIntosh, Alan; Nahmod, Andrea. Holomorphic functional calculi of operators, quadratic estimates and interpolation. Indiana Univ. Math. J. 46 (1997), no. 2, 375–403.
- Gilbert, John E.; Nahmod, Andrea R. Bilinear operators with non-smooth symbol. I. J. Fourier Anal. Appl. 7 (2001), no. 5, 435–467.
- Nahmod, Andrea; Stefanov, Atanas; Uhlenbeck, Karen. On the well-posedness of the wave map problem in high dimensions. Comm. Anal. Geom. 11 (2003), no. 1, 49–83.
