= Daisuke Takahashi (mathematician) =

Japanese computer scientist

- 高橋大介
- Occupations: Mathematician, professor, researcher
- Organizations: Association for Computing Machinery; Japan Society for Industrial and Applied Mathematics; Institute of Electrical and Electronics Engineers; Society for Industrial and Applied Mathematics; Information Processing Society of Japan; Japan Society for Industrial and Applied Mathematics
- Known for: Holds several records on the number of digits in the approximation of Pi, including 2.576 trillion digits of Pi and 100 quadrillionth hexadecimal digit of Pi
- Board member of: Japan Society of Fluid Mechanics; Mathematical Society of Japan; The Physical Society of Japan
- Awards: Yamashita SIG Research Award (1998); Gordon Bell Prize (2011)

Academic background
- Education: University of Tokyo

Academic work
- Discipline: Computer science
- Sub-discipline: High-performance numerical computing, Max-Plus algebra, soliton, Nonlinear system, ultradiscretization, ultradiscrete, integrable system, difference equation, cellular automaton
- Institutions: University of Tsukuba
- Notable students: Emma Haruka Iwao
- Website: www.hpcs.cs.tsukuba.ac.jp/~daisuke/index.html

Daisuke Takahashi is a professor of computer science at the University of Tsukuba, specializing in high-performance numerical computing.

== Education and career ==
Takahashi received a bachelor's degree in engineering in 1993 and a master's degree in engineering in 1995, both from Toyohashi University of Technology. He completed a Ph.D. in information science from the University of Tokyo in 1999. After working as a researcher at the University of Tokyo and at Saitama University, he joined the University of Tsukuba in 2001.

== Research ==
Takahashi's works include several records of the number of digits of the approximation of Pi. His work on the computation of Pi has inspired his former student Emma Haruka Iwao, who broke a new record on March 14, 2019.

In 2011, he was part of a team from the University of Tsukuba that won the Gordon Bell Prize of the Association for Computing Machinery for their work simulating the quantum states of a nanowire using the K computer.

He is also known for his research on the Fast Fourier transform, and is one of the developers of the HPC Challenge Benchmark.

== Selected works ==
=== Book ===
- Takahashi, Daisuke (5 October 2019). Fast Fourier Transform Algorithms for Parallel Computers. Springer Nature. ISBN 978-981-13-9965-7.

=== Papers ===
- Sugizaki, Yukimasa; Takahashi, Daisuke (July 2025). "Improved Modular Multiplication Algorithms Using Solely IEEE 754 Binary Floating-Point Operations". IEEE Transactions on Emerging Topics in Computing. 13 (3): 1259–1271. doi:10.1109/TETC.2025.3582551.
- Edamatsu, Takuya; Takahashi, Daisuke (1 January 2023). "Fast Multiple-Precision Integer Division Using Intel AVX-512". IEEE Transactions on Emerging Topics in Computing. 11 (1): 224–236. doi:10.1109/TETC.2022.3196147.
- Sakata, Kotaro; Tanaka, Yuta; Takahashi, Daisuke (1 April 2020). "Max-Plus Generalization of Conway's Game of Life". Complex Systems. 29 (1): 63–76. arXiv:1909.04235. doi:10.25088/ComplexSystems.29.1.63.
- Takahashi, Daisuke; Kanada, Yasumasa (February 2000). "High-Performance Radix-2, 3 and 5 Parallel 1-D Complex FFT Algorithms for Distributed-Memory Parallel Computers". The Journal of Supercomputing. 15 (2): 207–228. doi:10.1023/A:1008160021085.
