= ZUC stream cipher =

ZUC is a stream cipher included in the Long Term Evolution standards used in 3GPP specifications for confidentiality and integrity. It is named after Zu Chongzhi, the fifth-century Chinese mathematician.

It uses a 16-stage linear feedback shift register with each stage in ${\rm GF}(2^{31}-1)$ and produces a 32-bit word on each tick.
