= Qianli chuan =

Medieval Chinese paddle wheel boat

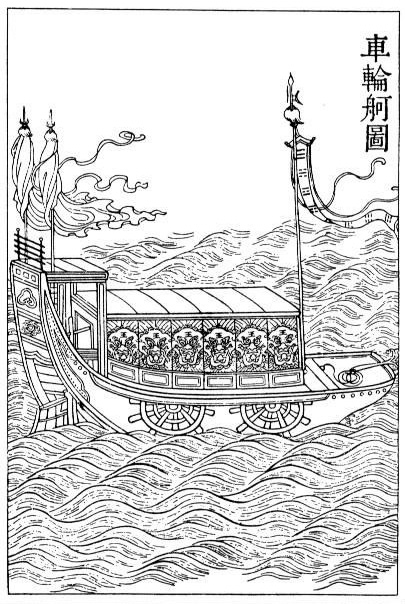
A Chinese paddle-wheel ship from a Qing dynasty encyclopedia published in 1726

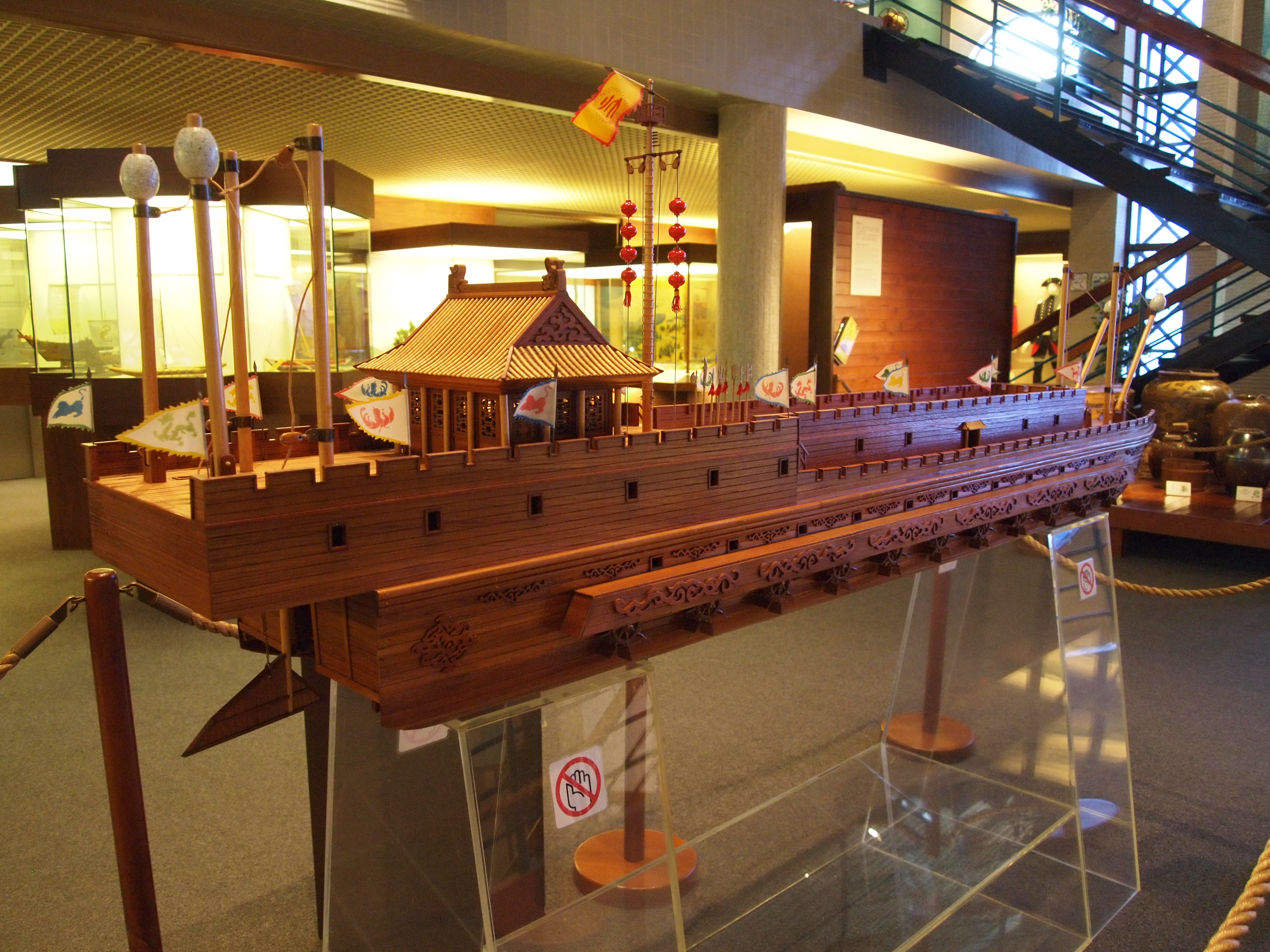
Modern reconstruction of a Tang dynasty paddle-wheel ship at the Macau Maritime Museum

Qianli chuan (Chinese: 千里船; pinyin: qiānlǐchuán; lit. 'thousand league boat') were paddle wheel boats used in medieval China. The boats were driven by human pedaling and were able to cruise hundreds of kilometers per day with no wind blowing.

== History ==
Qianli chuan were invented in the late 5th century AD during the Southern Qi dynasty, and the invention is attributed to the ancient Chinese astronomer and mathematician Zu Chongzhi. References made to the boat were made recalling various tests on the Xinting River, south of modern Nanjing. The boat was proven to be able to cruise several hundred kilometers in a single day without any wind blowing. Late-8th-century AD records have descriptions of the qanli chuan as a type of naval boat that had two wheels found on its sides that was propelled by treadmills.

The boat was recorded as being used in the battle of Caishi and battle of Tangdao.

== See also ==
- Naval history of China
