= Chudnovsky brothers =

American mathematicians

David Volfovich Chudnovsky (Note: Ukrainian: Давид Вольфович Чудновський, romanized: Davyd Volfovych Chudnovskyi, Давид Вольфович Чудновский) (born January 22, 1947) and Gregory Volfovich Chudnovsky (Note: Ukrainian: Григорій Вольфович Чудновський, romanized: Hryhorii Volfovych Chudnovskyi, Григорий Вольфович Чудновский) (born April 17, 1952) are American mathematicians and engineers known for their world-record mathematical calculations and developing the Chudnovsky algorithm used to calculate the digits of π with extreme precision. The brothers were both born in Kiev, Ukrainian SSR, Soviet Union (now Kyiv, Ukraine).

== Careers in mathematics ==
As a child, Gregory Chudnovsky was given a copy of What Is Mathematics? by his father (Volf Grigorovich Chudnovski, a Soviet professor of technical sciences) and decided that he wanted to be a mathematician. As a high schooler, he solved Hilbert's tenth problem, shortly after Yuri Matiyasevich had solved it. He received a mathematics degree from Kyiv State University in 1974 and a PhD the following year from the Institute of Mathematics, National Academy of Sciences of Ukraine.

In part to avoid antisemitic religious persecution and in part to seek better medical care for Gregory, who had been diagnosed with myasthenia gravis, a neuromuscular disease, the Chudnovsky family applied in 1976 for permission to emigrate from the Soviet Union. Although the family was harassed by the KGB for attempting to leave the country, the brothers were eventually able to secure their emigration with the help of United States Senator Henry M. Jackson and mathematician Edwin Hewitt.

A 1992 article in The New Yorker quoted the opinion of several mathematicians that Gregory Chudnovsky was one of the world's best living mathematicians. David Chudnovsky works closely with and assists his brother Gregory.

Despite their accomplishments and the attention brought to them by their profile in The New Yorker, the Chudnovsky brothers largely worked alone for decades. A 1997 Karen Arenson article in The New York Times theorized that this was due to some combination of the brothers' lack of a specialization (they worked on topics including number theory, applied physics and computers), Gregory's medical condition, their refusal to leave New York City and their insistence on being hired together. In the summer of 1997, they were hired as professors at Polytechnic University in Brooklyn after borough president Howard Golden helped find funding for their salaries.

The Chudnovsky brothers have held records, at different times, for computing π to the largest number of places, including two billion digits in the early 1990s on a supercomputer they built (dubbed "m-zero") in their apartment in Manhattan. In 1987, the Chudnovsky brothers developed the algorithm (now called the Chudnovsky algorithm) that they used to break several π computation records. Today, this algorithm is used by Mathematica to calculate π, and has continued to be used by others who have achieved world records in pi calculation.

The brothers also assisted the Metropolitan Museum of Art around 2003 in the merging of a series of digital photographs taken of The Hunt of the Unicorn tapestries during their cleaning. PBS aired a program on its science show Nova, hosted by Robert Krulwich, that described the difficulties in photographing the tapestries and the math used to fix them.

The brothers later became Distinguished Industry Professors at the New York University Tandon School of Engineering, where they work on subjects such as graph isomorphism. Gregory was awarded the MacArthur Fellowship (also known as the "Genius Grant") in 1981.
