= HITAC S-3000 =

The HITAC S-3000 is a former family of vector supercomputers, which was developed, manufactured and marketed by Hitachi. Announced in April 1992, the family succeeded the HITAC S-820. The S-3000 family comprised the low-end and mid-range S-3600 models and the high-end S-3800 models. Unlike Hitachi's previous generations of supercomputers, the S-3000 family was marketed outside Japan.

The S-3600 was an improved version of the S-820 implemented in more modern semiconductor technology. The S-3800 was a new design, differing significantly from the previous generations. It was a parallel vector processor and supported one to four vector processors.

In 1994, the S-3000 family was complemented by an MPP machine that used superscalar microprocessors, the SR2001. Hitachi eventually discontinued development of vector supercomputers in favor of this approach. The S-3000 family was replaced in 2000 by the SR8000, making it the last vector supercomputer from Hitachi.

The CPU architecture of HITACHI S-3800 Series was based on IBM System/370, and compatible with Hitachi's mainframe systems. It supported two operating systems: OSF/1 Unix and Hitachi's own VOS3 (a fork of IBM MVS).

== See also ==
- HITAC S-810
- HITAC S-820
- Hitachi SR2201
- Hitachi SR8000
- Supercomputing in Japan
