= HITAC S-820 =

Japanese supercomputer

- Active: 1987 -
- Memory: maximum 512MB
- Speed: theoretical peak performance of 2 GFLOPS

The HITAC S-820 is a family of vector supercomputers developed, manufactured and marketed by Hitachi. Announced in July 1987, it was Hitachi's second supercomputer, succeeding the HITAC S-810. The S-820 is categorized as a second generation Japanese supercomputer.

The S-820 system has both a scalar and vector processor, similar to the architecture of the S-810. The scalar processor is based on the Hitachi M-series mainframe processor, so is compatible with its operating system. The S-820 was reported to have a theoretical peak performance of 2 GFLOPS, and a theoretical maximum computational performance of 3 GFLOPS.

Initially the S-820 was available in two variations: the S-820 model 80 and the S-820 model 60 (hereafter S-820/80 and S-820/60). The S-820/80 had double the vector computational capability, as well as more storage capability, compared to the S-820/60. The peak performance of the S-820/80 was 3 GFLOPS, and that of the S-820/60 as 1.5 GFLOPS.

There were five models. The first two, the mid-range S-820/60 with a peak performance of 1.5 GFLOPS and the top-end S-820/80 with a peak performance of 3.0 GFLOPS, were announced in July 1987. These two models differ in the number of vector pipelines installed. In May 1988, the S-820/20 and S-820/40 were announced, followed by the S-820/15 in November 1989.

A team from the Institute for Supercomputing Research (Tokyo) and the Los Alamos National Laboratory benchmarked the S-820/80 against the similar generation NEC SX-2 and Cray X-MP/416, as well as the S-810, during early 1988. They concluded that the S-820 was "a great deal faster in vector mode than any other supercomputer we have measured".

== See also ==
- HITAC S-810
- HITAC S-3000
- Supercomputing in Japan
