= Zacharias Dase =

German mental calculist and mathematician

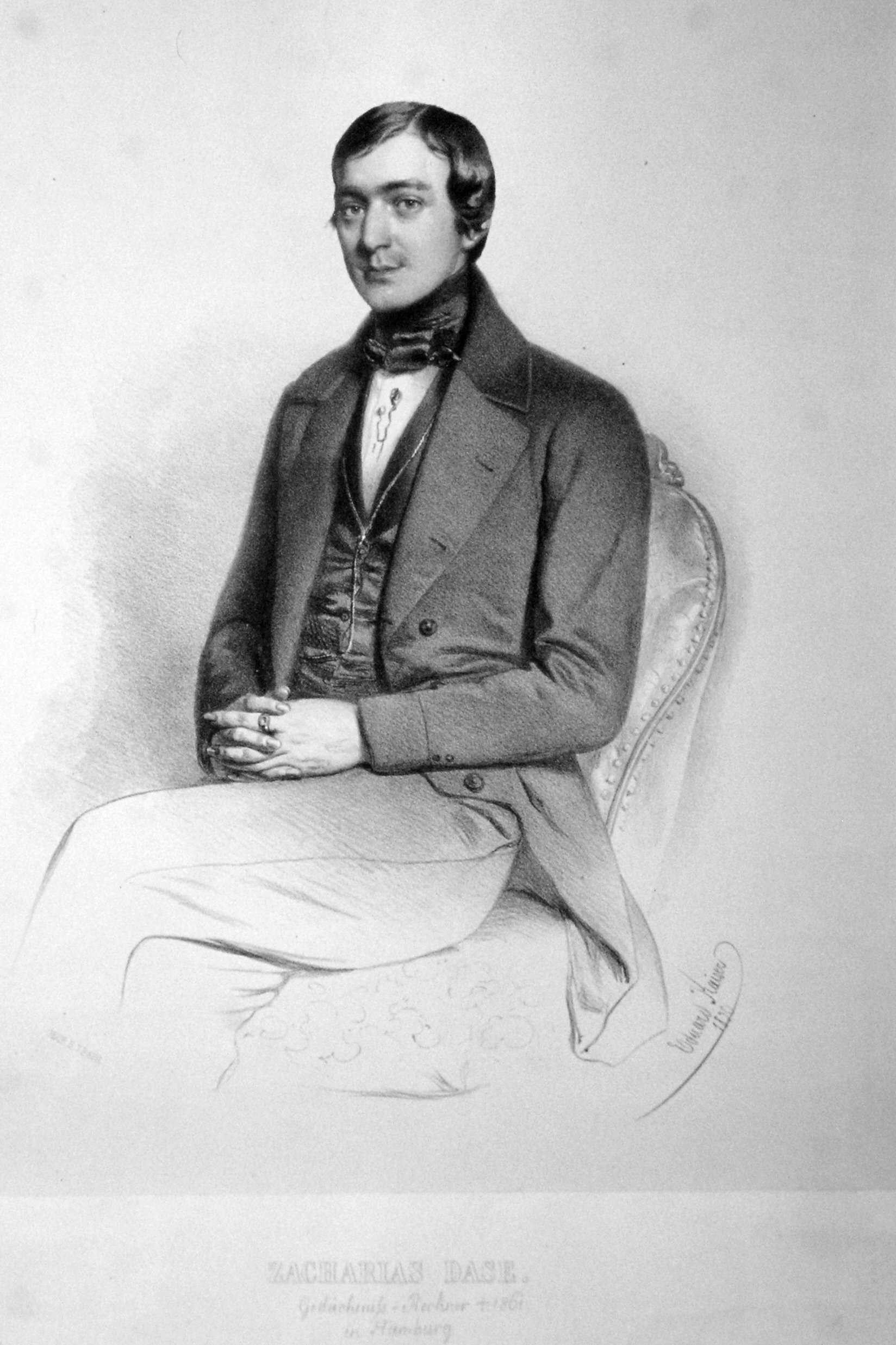
Zacharias Dase, by Eduard Kaiser, 1850

Johann Martin Zacharias Dase (June 23, 1824, Hamburg – September 11, 1861, Hamburg) was a German mental calculator.

He attended schools in Hamburg from a very early age, but later admitted that his instruction had little influence on him. He used to spend a lot of time playing dominoes, and suggested that this played a significant role in developing his calculating skills. Dase had epilepsy from early childhood throughout his life.

At age 15 he began to travel extensively, giving exhibitions in Germany, Austria and England. Among his most impressive feats, he multiplied 79532853 × 93758479 in 54 seconds. He multiplied two 20-digit numbers in 6 minutes; two 40-digit numbers in 40 minutes; and two 100-digit numbers in 8 hours 45 minutes. The famous mathematician Carl Friedrich Gauss commented that someone skilled in calculation could have done the 100-digit calculation in about half that time with pencil and paper.

These exhibitions however did not earn him enough money, so he tried to find other employments. In 1844 he obtained a position in the Railway Department of Vienna, but this didn't last long since in 1845 he was reported in Mannheim and in 1846 in Berlin.

In 1844, Dase calculated π to 200 decimal places over the course of approximately two months, a record for the time, from the Machin-like formula:

$$\frac{\pi}{4} = \arctan \frac{1}{2} + \arctan \frac{1}{5} + \arctan \frac{1}{8}.$$

He also calculated a 7-digit logarithm table and extended a table of integer factorizations from 6,000,000 to 9,000,000.

Dase had very little knowledge of mathematical theory. The mathematician Julius Petersen tried to teach him some of Euclid's theorems, but gave up the task once he realized that their comprehension was beyond Dase's capabilities. Gauss however was very impressed with his calculating skill, and he recommended that the Hamburg Academy of Sciences should allow Dase to do mathematical work on a full-time basis, but Dase died shortly thereafter.

The book "Gödel, Escher, Bach" by Douglas Hofstadter mentions his calculating abilities. "... he also had an uncanny sense of quantity. That is, he could just 'tell', without counting, how many sheep were in a field, or words in a sentence, and so forth, up to about 30."
