= Ferranti Pegasus =

Type of vacuum-tube computer

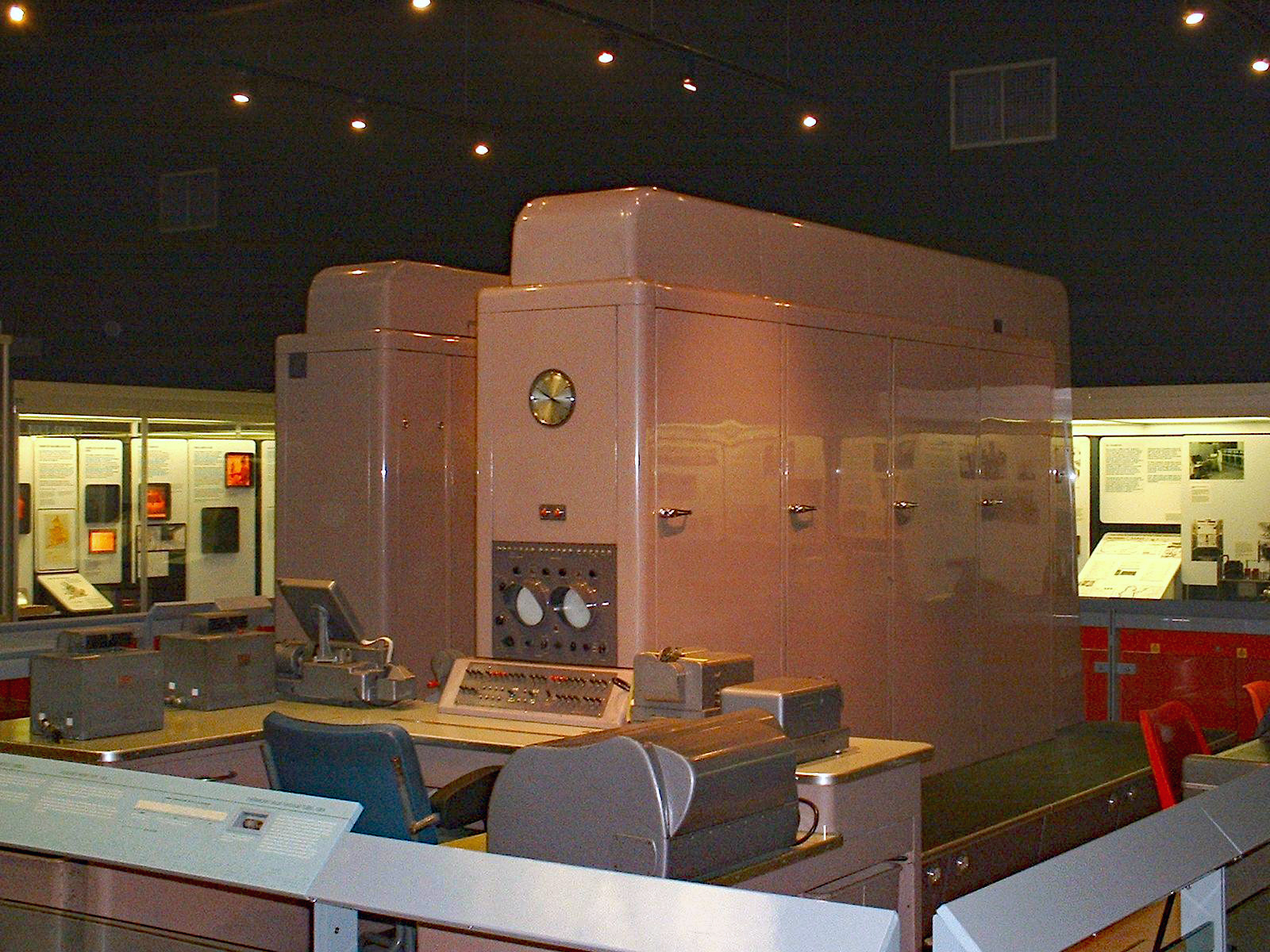
A typical Pegasus computer installation, on view at the Science Museum, London

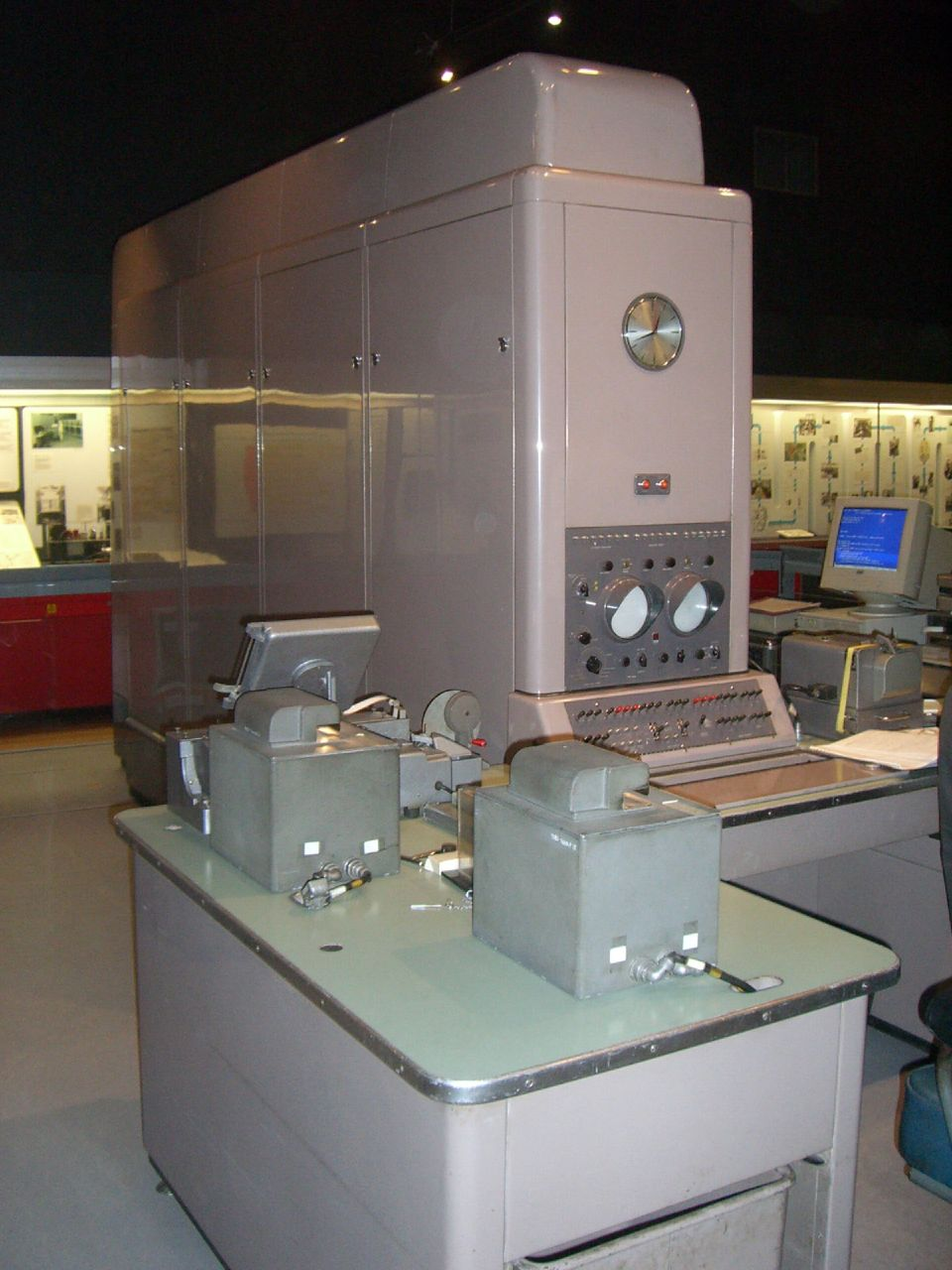

Pegasus was an early British vacuum-tube (valve) computer built by Ferranti Ltd that pioneered design features to improve usability for both engineers and programmers. It was originally named the Ferranti Package Computer as its hardware design followed that of the Elliott 401 with modular plug-in packages. Much of the development was the product of three men: W. S. (Bill) Elliott (hardware), Christopher Strachey (software) and Bernard Swann (marketing and customer support). It was Ferranti's most popular valve computer with 38 units being sold. The first Pegasus was delivered in 1956 and the last was delivered in 1959. Ferranti received funding for the development from the National Research Development Corporation (NRDC).

At least two Pegasus machines survive today: one in The Science Museum, London and one which was displayed in the Science and Industry Museum, Manchester but which has now been moved to the storage in the Science Museum archives at Wroughton. The Pegasus in The Science Museum, London ran its first program in December 1959 and was regularly demonstrated until 2009 when it developed a severe electrical fault. In early 2014, the Science Museum decided to retire it permanently, effectively ending the life of one of the world's oldest working computers. The Pegasus officially held the title of the world's oldest computer until 2012, when the restoration of the Harwell computer was completed at the National Museum of Computing.

== Design ==
In those days it was common for it to be unclear whether a failure was due to the hardware or the program. As a consequence, Christopher Strachey of NRDC, who was himself a brilliant programmer, recommended the following design objectives:

1. The necessity for optimum programming (favoured by Alan Turing) was to be minimised, "because it tended to become a time-wasting intellectual hobby of the programmers".
2. The needs of the programmer were to be a governing factor in selecting the instruction set.
3. It was to be cheap and reliable.

The first objective was only partially met, because both program code and the data on which it was to operate had to be in the 128 words of primary storage contained in 8-word nickel delay lines. The rest of the memory was held on a 7936-word magnetic drum, which rotated at 3750 rpm, so it was often necessary to use ingenuity to reduce the number of transfers between the fast store and the drum.

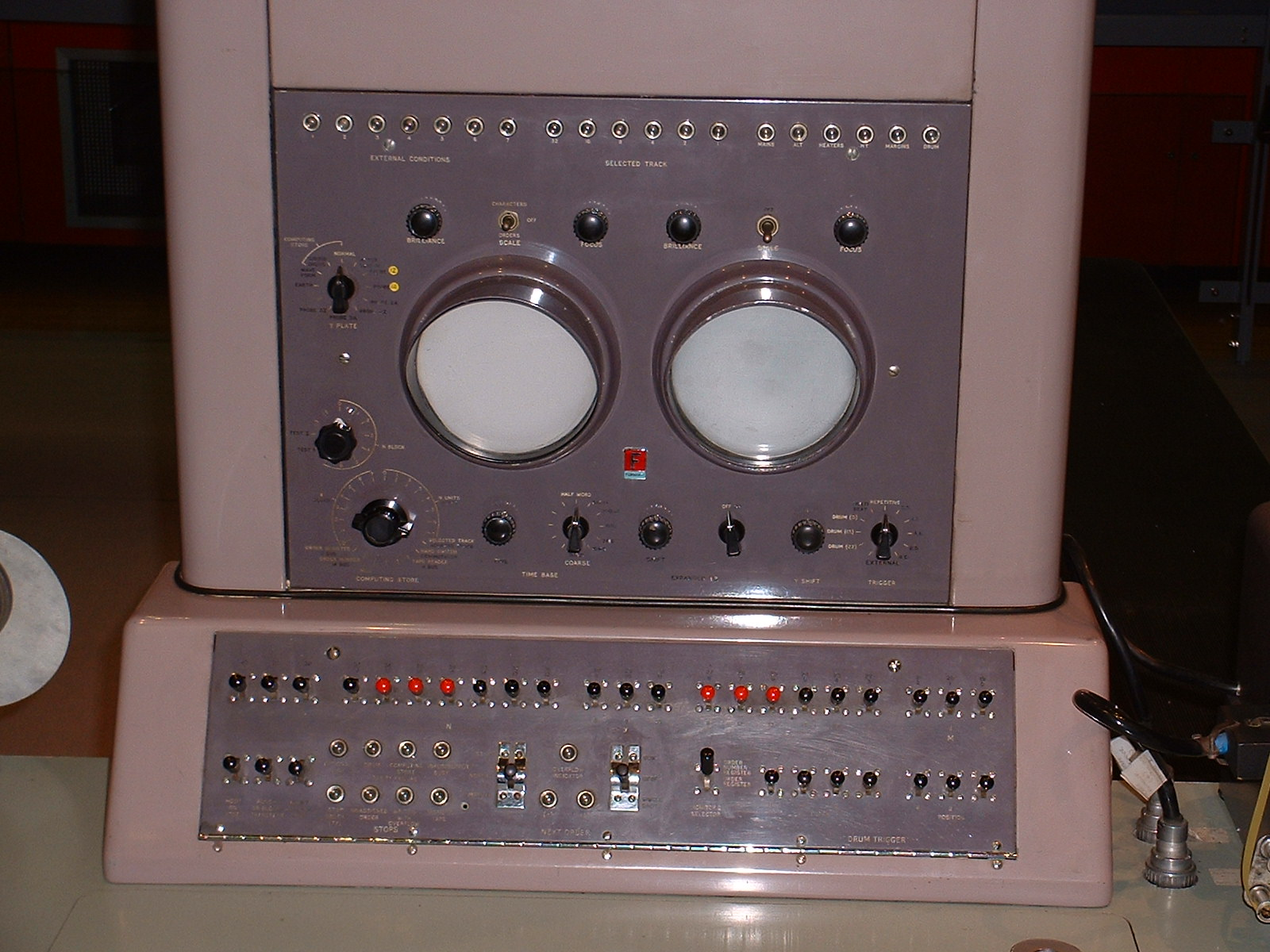
The front panel of the Pegasus

Pegasus had eight accumulators, seven of which could also be used as index registers, the first computer to allow this dual use. Accumulators 6 and 7 were known as p and q and were involved in multiplication and division and some double-length shift instructions. Each word contained 39 bits plus 1 bit for parity checking. Two 19-bit instructions were packed into one word, with the extra bit that could be used to indicate a breakpoint (optional stop), to assist in debugging. In line with Strachey's second objective, it had a relatively generous instruction set for a computer of its time, but there was no explicit hardware provision for handling either characters or floating-point numbers.

The speed of arithmetic operations was about the same as in the Elliott 402 computer, which could add in 204 microseconds and multiply in 3366 microseconds. The Pegasus basic instruction cycle time for add/subtract/move and logical instructions was 128 microseconds. Multiply, divide, justify and shift instructions took a variable time to complete. Transfers to and from the drum were synchronous. The layout of blocks on the drum was interleaved to allow some processing between transfers to/from consecutive blocks. The computer was advertised as weighing 2,560 lb (1.2 t).

The extent to which Strachey's third objective was reached depends on how one views a price of £50,000 for Pegasus 1, which did not have magnetic tape drives, line printer or punched card input and output. The modular design with plug-in units of hardware did, however, make it very reliable by the standards of the day, and maintenance was "a doddle of a job". In its second year of use in 1958–59, the Pegasus at King's College (part of Durham University) in Newcastle upon Tyne had a typical reliability in excess of 98%, and 95.4% overall.

== Applications ==
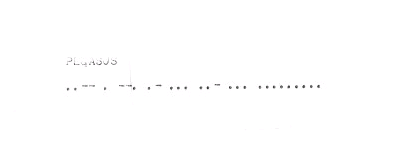
A printout from a Pegasus computer

The initial version of Pegasus, Pegasus 1 was intended for scientific and engineering applications. Its input was via 5-hole paper tape with output on tape. The variant for business data processing was called Pegasus 2 and could be equipped with punched cards, magnetic tape and line printer.

In 1956 the first Pegasus was used to calculate the stresses and strains in the tail plane of the Saunders-Roe SR.53; the results were used to check the manufacturer's figures; the programmer was Anne Robson. Because of the importance of a computer, it was housed in the drawing room, complete with an Adam's ceiling, of Ferranti's London office in Portland Place.

A Pegasus 1 was installed at Cybor House, Sheffield by Stafford Beer for the use of United Steel. It was the first computer installed for management cybernetics. The Pegasus at Southampton University was used for analysis of ground resonance data for the Saro P.531 helicopter, which eventually entered production as the Westland Scout and Westland Wasp.

In 1957 a Pegasus computer was used to calculate 7480 digits of π, a record at the time. In 1959 Handley Page Ltd were advertising for experienced Pegasus programmers to join their aviation design team at Cricklewood, London

The Computing Laboratory at Newcastle University (then "King's College, Durham University") was established in 1957, and a Ferranti Pegasus was installed as the first computer – reputed at the time to be the first computer of any kind in the North East of England.

The University of Leeds had a Pegasus computer, run by Sandy Douglas. This was used, among other things, for a project to process the University's matriculation records and by the British Market Research Bureau to analyse National Readership Survey data.

Other people who worked on the Pegasus included Hugh McGregor Ross and Donald B. Gillies.

== See also ==
- List of vacuum-tube computers

== Bibliography ==
- Berners-Lee, C. M. (22 May 1969). "Pegasus – A Pioneer in Reliability and Ease of Use" (PDF). Computer Weekly. p. 12. Archived (PDF) from the original on 18 June 2022.
- Felton, G. E. (1962), The Pegasus Programming Manual (PDF), London: Ferranti Ltd.
- Kershaw, Donald, "Experiences with Pegasus 1", Resurrection: The Bulletin of the Computer Conservation Society (14)
- Lavington, Simon (1980). Early British Computers: The Story of Vintage Computers and the People Who Built Them. Manchester University Press. pp. 78–86, 102–105. ISBN 0719008034 – via Internet Archive.
- Lavington, Simon (2000), The Pegasus Story: A history of a vintage British computer, London: Science Museum, ISBN 978-1900747400
- Ross, Hugh McGregor (2012), Pegasus: The Early Seminal Computer, Colleagues, Sandy, Bedfordshire: Authors Online, ISBN 978-0-7552-1482-2
- The Ferranti Pegasus Computer (YouTube). The Science Museum. 13 May 2015.
- Weik, Martin H. (June 1957). A Second Survey of Domestic Electronic Digital Computing Systems (Report). Aberdeen, MD: Ballistic Research Laboratory. pp. 112–114. BRL Report No. 1010 – via HathiTrust.
