= Zhao Youqin's π algorithm =

1320s calculation of pi by Zhao Youqin

Zhao Youqin's π algorithm

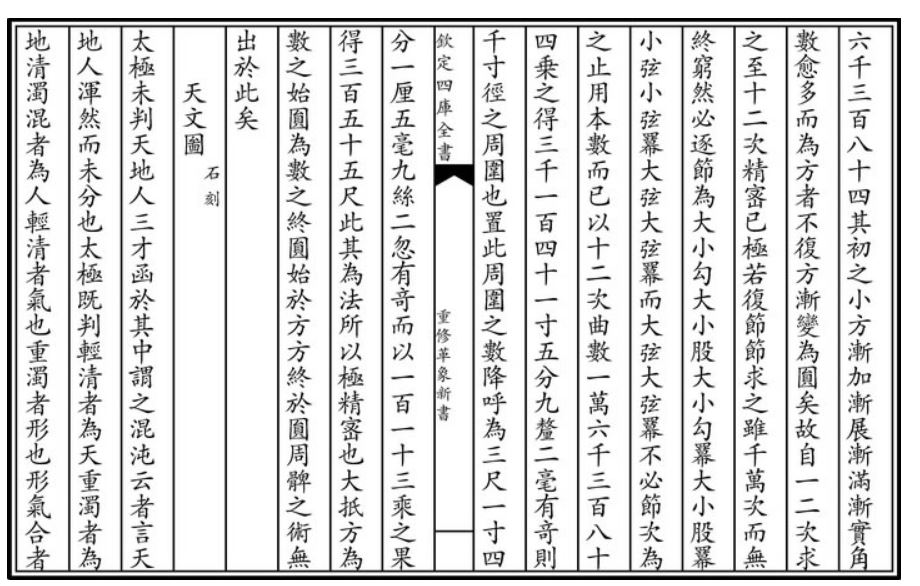
A page from Zhao Youqin's book Ge Xiang Xin Shu vol 5

Zhao Youqin's π algorithm is an algorithm devised by Yuan dynasty Chinese astronomer and mathematician Zhao Youqin (赵友钦, ? – 1330) to calculate the value of π in his book Ge Xiang Xin Shu (革象新书).

== Algorithm ==
Zhao Youqin started with an inscribed square in a circle with radius r.

If $\ell$ denotes the length of a side of the square, draw a perpendicular line d from the center of the circle to side l. Let e denotes r − d. Then from the diagram:

$$d=\sqrt{r^2-\left(\frac{\ell}{2}\right)^2}$$

$$e=r-d=r-\sqrt{r^2-\left(\frac{\ell}{2}\right)^2}.$$

Extend the perpendicular line d to dissect the circle into an octagon; $\ell_2$ denotes the length of one side of octagon.

$$\ell_2=\sqrt{\left(\frac{\ell}{2}\right)^2+e^2}$$

$$\ell_2=\frac{1}{2}\sqrt{ \ell^2 +4\left(r-\frac{1}{2} \sqrt{4r^2-\ell^2}\right)^2}$$

Let $l_3$ denotes the length of a side of hexadecagon

$$\ell_3=\frac{1}{2}\sqrt{ \ell_2^2 +4\left(r-\frac{1}{2}\sqrt{4r^2-\ell_2^2}\right)^2    }$$

similarly

$$\ell_{n+1}=\frac{1}{2}\sqrt{ \ell_n^2 +4\left(r-\frac{1}{2}\sqrt{4r^2-\ell_n^2}\right)^2}$$

Proceeding in this way, he at last calculated the side of a 16384-gon, multiplying it by 16384 to obtain 3141.592 for a circle with diameter = 1000 units, or

$$\pi =3.141592. \,$$

He multiplied this number by 113 and obtained 355. From this he deduced that of the traditional values of π, that is 3, 3.14, 22/7 and 355/113, the last is the most exact.

== See also ==
- Liu Hui's π algorithm
