= Zu Chongzhi =

Chinese mathematician-astronomer (429–500)

- Traditional Chinese: 祖沖之
- Simplified Chinese: 祖冲之
Transcriptions
Standard Mandarin
- Hanyu Pinyin: Zǔ Chōngzhī
- Wade–Giles: Tsu Ch'ung-chih

Wenyuan (courtesy name)
- Traditional Chinese: 文遠
- Simplified Chinese: 文远
Transcriptions
Standard Mandarin
- Hanyu Pinyin: Wényuǎn

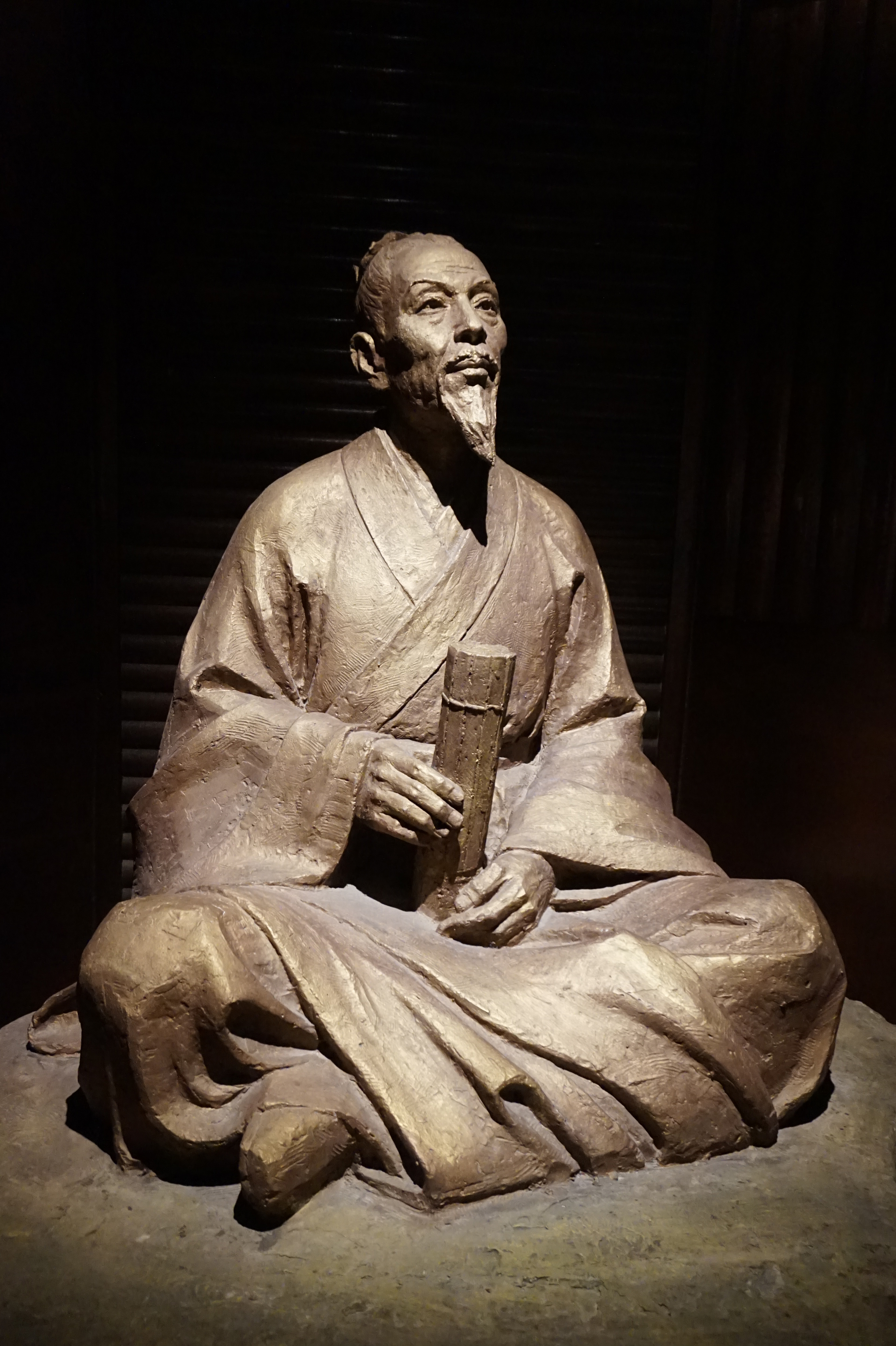
Statue of Zu Chongzhi

Zu Chongzhi (Chinese: 祖沖之; 429–500), courtesy name Wenyuan (Chinese: 文遠), was a Chinese astronomer, inventor, mathematician, politician, and writer during the Liu Song and Southern Qi dynasties. He was most notable for calculating pi as between 3.1415926 and 3.1415927, a record in precision which would not be surpassed for nearly 900 years.

== Life and works ==
Chongzhi's ancestry was from modern Baoding, Hebei. To flee from the ravages of war, Zu's grandfather Zu Chang (祖昌) moved to the Yangtze, as part of the massive population movement during the Eastern Jin. Zu Chang at one point held the position of Chief Minister for the Palace Buildings (大匠卿) within the Liu Song and was in charge of government construction projects. Zu's father, Zu Shuozhi (祖朔之), also served the court and was greatly respected for his erudition.

Zu was born in Jiankang. His family had historically been involved in astronomical research, and from childhood Zu was exposed to both astronomy and mathematics. When he was only a youth, his talent earned him much repute. When Emperor Xiaowu of Song heard of him, he was sent to the Hualin Xuesheng (華林學省) academy, and later the Imperial Nanjing University (Zongmingguan) to perform research. In 461 in Nanxu (today Zhenjiang, Jiangsu), he was engaged in work at the office of the local governor. In 464, Zu moved to Louxian (today Songjiang district, Shanghai), there, he compiled the Daming calendar and calculated π.

Zu Chongzhi, along with his son Zu Gengzhi, wrote a mathematical text entitled Zhui Shu (綴述; "Methods for Interpolation"). Though originally one of the Ten Computational Canons, this book has been lost since the Song dynasty.

== Astronomy ==
Zu was an accomplished astronomer who calculated the time values with unprecedented precision. His methods of interpolation and the use of integration were far ahead of his time. Even the results of the astronomer Yi Xing (who was beginning to utilize foreign knowledge) were not comparable. The Song dynasty calendar was backwards to the "Northern barbarians" because they were implementing their daily lives with the Daming calendar. It is said that his methods of calculation were so advanced that the scholars of the Song dynasty and Indian-influenced astronomers of the Tang dynasty found them confusing.

== Mathematics ==
The majority of Zu's great mathematical works are recorded in his lost text the Zhui Shu. It is said that the treatise contained formulas for the volume of a sphere, cubic equations and an accurate value of pi. Most schools argue about his complexity since traditionally the Chinese had developed mathematics as algebraic and equational. Logically, scholars assume that the Zhui Shu yields methods of cubic equations. His works on the accurate value of pi describe the lengthy calculations involved. Zu used Liu Hui's π algorithm described earlier by Liu Hui to inscribe a 12,288-gon. Zu's value of pi is precise to six decimal places and for almost nine hundred years thereafter no subsequent mathematician computed a value this precise. Zu also worked on deducing the formula for the volume of a sphere with his son Zu Gengzhi. In their calculation, Zu used the concept that two solids with equal cross-sectional areas at equal heights must also have equal volumes to find the volume of a Steinmetz solid. And further multiplied the volume of the Steinmetz solid with π/4, therefore found the volume of a sphere as πd^3/6 (d is the diameter of the sphere).

Zu Chongzhi's mathematical achievements included:

- the Daming calendar (大明曆) introduced by him in 465.
- distinguishing the sidereal year and the tropical year. He measured 45 years and 11 months per degree between those two; today we know the difference is 70.7 years per degree.
- calculating one year as 365.24281481 days, which is very close to 365.24219878 days as we know today.
- calculating the number of overlaps between sun and moon as 27.21223, which is very close to 27.21222 as we know today; using this number he successfully predicted an eclipse four times during 23 years (from 436 to 459).
- calculating the Jupiter year as about 11.858 Earth years, which is very close to 11.862 as we know of today.
- deriving two approximations of pi, (3.1415926535897932...) which held as the most accurate approximation for π for over nine hundred years. His best approximation was between 3.1415926 and 3.1415927, with 355/113 (密率, milü, close ratio) and 22/7 (約率, yuelü, approximate ratio) being the other notable approximations. He obtained the result by approximating a circle with a 24,576 (= 2^{13} × 3) sided polygon. This was an impressive feat for the time, especially considering that the counting rods he used for recording intermediate results were merely a pile of wooden sticks laid out in certain patterns. Japanese mathematician Yoshio Mikami pointed out, "22/7 was nothing more than the π value obtained several hundred years earlier by the Greek mathematician Archimedes, however milü π = 355/113 could not be found in any Greek, Indian or Arabian manuscripts, not until 1585 Dutch mathematician Adriaan Anthoniszoon obtained this fraction; the Chinese possessed this most extraordinary fraction over a whole millennium earlier than Europe". Hence Mikami strongly urged that the fraction 355/113 be named after Zu Chongzhi as Zu's fraction. In Chinese literature, this fraction is known as "Zu's ratio". Zu's ratio is a best rational approximation to π, and is the closest rational approximation to π from all fractions with denominator less than 16600.
- finding the volume of a sphere as πD^{3}/6 where D is diameter (equivalent to 4πr^{3}/3).

== Inventions and innovations ==
=== Hammer mills ===
In 488, Zu Chongzhi was responsible for erecting water powered trip hammer mills which was inspected by Emperor Wu of Southern Qi during the early 490s.

=== Paddle boats ===
Zu is also credited with inventing Chinese paddle boats or Qianli chuan in the late 5th century AD during the Southern Qi dynasty. The boats made sailing a more reliable form of transportation and based on the shipbuilding technology of its day, numerous paddle wheel ships were constructed during the Tang era as the boats were able to cruise at faster speeds than the existing vessels at the time as well as being able to cover hundreds of kilometers of distance without the aid of wind.

=== South pointing chariot ===
The south-pointing chariot device was first invented by the Chinese mechanical engineer Ma Jun (c. 200–265 AD). It was a wheeled vehicle that incorporated an early use of differential gears to operate a fixed figurine that would constantly point south, hence enabling one to accurately measure their directional bearings. This effect was achieved not by magnetics (like in a compass), but through intricate mechanics, the same design that allows equal amounts of torque applied to wheels rotating at different speeds for the modern automobile. After the Three Kingdoms period, the device fell out of use temporarily. However, it was Zu Chongzhi who successfully re-invented it in 478, as described in the texts of the Book of Song and the Book of Qi, with a passage from the latter below:

When Emperor Wu of Liu Song subdued Guanzhong he obtained the south-pointing carriage of Yao Xing, but it was only the shell with no machinery inside. Whenever it moved it had to have a man inside to turn (the figure). In the Sheng-Ming reign period, Gao Di commissioned Zi Zu Chongzhi to reconstruct it according to the ancient rules. He accordingly made new machinery of bronze, which would turn round about without a hitch and indicate the direction with uniformity. Since Ma Jun's time such a thing had not been.

== Literature ==
Zu's paradoxographical work Accounts of Strange Things [述異記] survives.

== Named after him ==
- π ≈ 355/113 as Zu Chongzhi's π ratio
- The lunar crater Tsu Chung-Chi
- 1888 Zu Chong-Zhi is the name of asteroid 1964 VO1
- ZUC stream cipher, an encryption algorithm
- Zhuchongzi, a series of quantum computers developed by researchers at the University of Science and Technology of China in Hefei
