= Y-cruncher =

Computer program

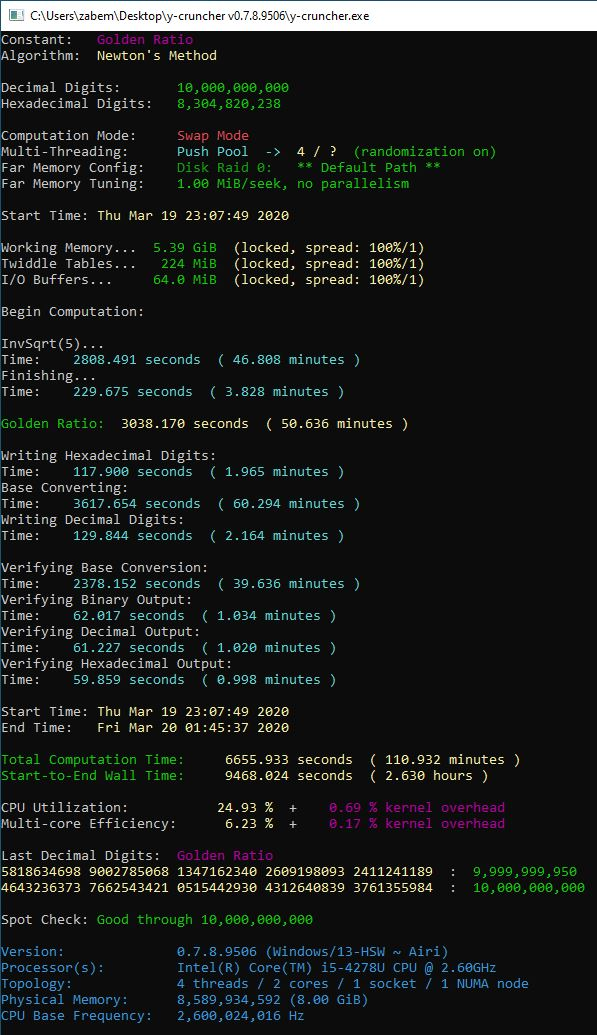
Screenshot of y-cruncher after a calculation of the golden ratio

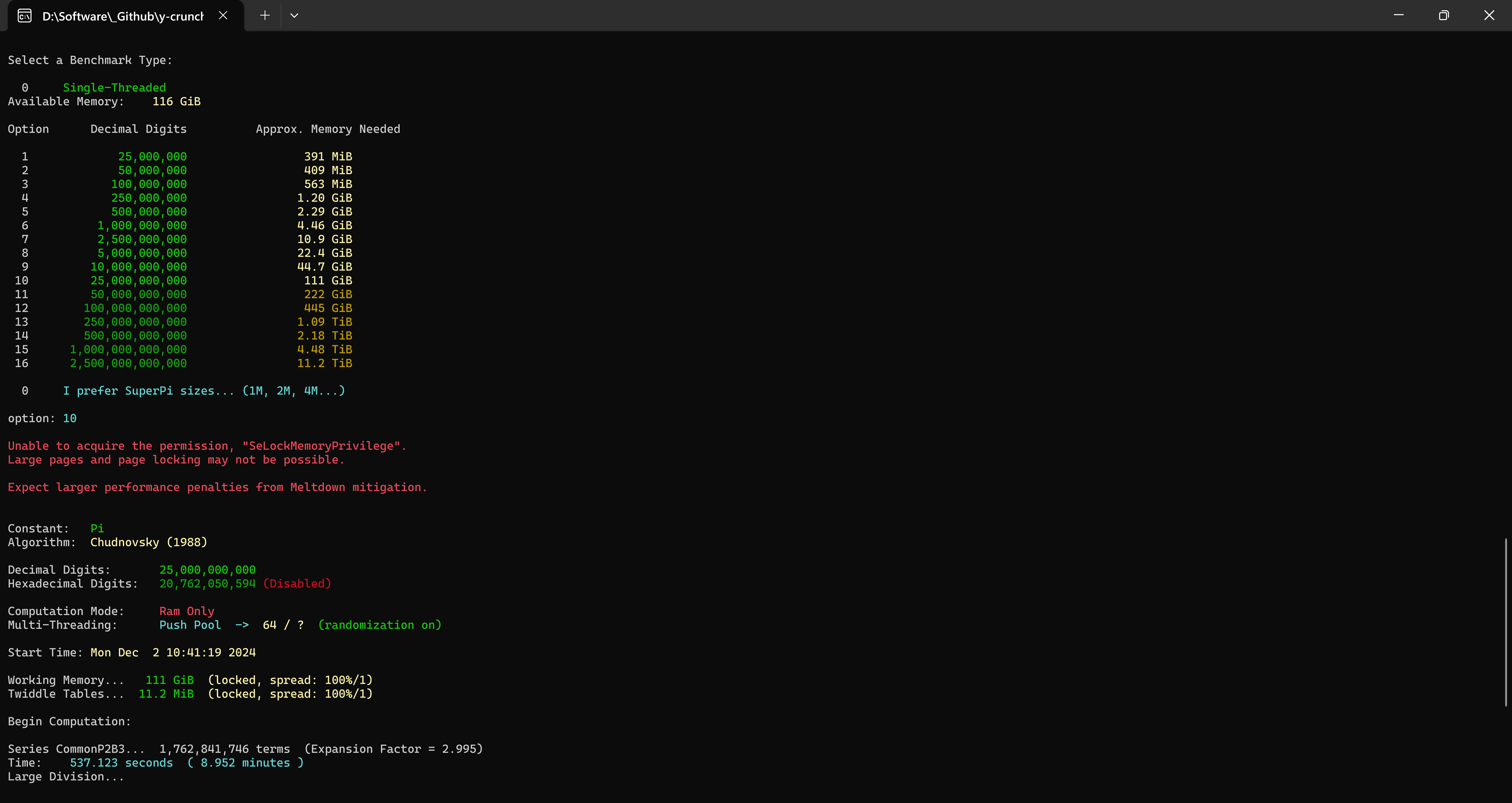
π can be calculated with any number of digits – for larger calculations, a lot of RAM is necessary. In this case, 25 billion digits of Pi are calculated in 10.4 minutes.

y-cruncher is a computer program used for the calculation of some mathematical constant with theoretical accuracy limited only by computing time and available storage space. It was originally developed to calculate the Euler-Mascheroni constant 𝛾; the y is derived from it in the name.

Since 2010, y-cruncher has been used for all record calculations of the number π and other constants.

The software is downloadable from the website of the developers for Microsoft Windows and Linux. It does not have a graphical interface, but works on the command line. Calculation options are selected or entered via the text menu, the results are saved as a file.

Some popular uses of y-cruncher are running hardware benchmarks to measure performance of a computer system. An example of such benchmark is HWBOT. y-cruncher can also be used for stress-tests, as performed computations are sensitive to RAM errors and the program can automatically detect such errors.

== Development ==
Alexander J. Yee started developing in high school a Java library for arbitrary-precision arithmetic called "BigNumber". With this he was able, together with his roommate Raymond Chan, on 8 December 2006 to set the world record for the most number of calculated decimal places for the Euler-Mascheroni constant with 116 580 041 decimal places. In January 2009, they broke their own record and calculated 14 922 244 782 decimal places. At this point, the program was renamed to "y-cruncher" and ported to C and C++.

In the aftermath, Shigeru Kondo with the help of y-cruncher calculated π to 5 trillion digits on 2 August 2010.

Next year, Yee and Kondo calculated 10 trillion decimal places and broke the then-valid world record for decimal places of π. After that, Yee decided to completely overhaul the program and rewrite it from scratch in version v0.6.1. This enabled determining π with 12.1 trillion digits in just 94 days compared to 371 days that were spent for the previous record.

== Properties ==
y-cruncher has the following characteristic properties:

- Multithreading
- Vector instruction sets (see SIMD)
- Swapping
- Using multiple hard drives (in RAID)
- Automatic detection and correction of smaller arithmetic errors
- Processor-specific optimization

== Calculations ==
Since 2009, most of the world record-level calculations of mathematical constants have been performed with y-cruncher. The technical challenge does not (any longer) lie in the calculation itself, but in providing an environment that enables a comparatively efficient execution.

Current world records set with y-cruncher
Mathematical constant	Digits	Number of decimal places	Date	Carried out by
π	3.14159...	314000000000000	19 Nov 2025	Storage Review
√2	1.41421...	28000000000000	8 Jun 2025	Teck Por Lim
√3	1.73205...	4000000000000	23 May 2025	DMAHJEFF
√5	2.23606...	2250000000000	7 Oct 2021	John Kominek
√7	2.64575...	2275000000000	7 Oct 2021	John Kominek
√11	3.31662...	2284000000000	9 Oct 2021	John Kominek
Golden ratio	1.61803...	20000000000000	27 Nov 2023	Jordan Ranous
Euler's number	2.71828...	35000000000000	24 Dec 2023	Jordan Ranous
Euler-Mascheroni constant	0.57721...	1337000000000	7 Sep 2023	Andrew Sun
Apéry constant	1.20205...	2020569031595	22 Dec 2023	Andrew Sun
Lemniscate constant	2.62205...	2000000000000	16 May 2025	Lorenz Milla
Catalan's constant	0.91596...	1200000000100	9 Mar 2022	Seungmin Kim
ln 2	0.69314...	3100000000000	2 Oct 2025	Mamdouh Barakat
ln 10	2.30258...	2000000000100	6 Jun 2025	Lorenz Milla
Gamma(1/3)	2.67893...	1300000000000	6 Aug 2025	Mamdouh Barakat
Gamma(1/4)	3.62560...	1200000000000	13 Jun 2025	Dmitriy Grigoryev
Gamma(1/5)	4.59084...	270000000000	5 Oct 2025	Dmitriy Grigoryev
Zeta(5)	1.03692...	600000000000	23 Oct 2025	Dmitriy Grigoryev
ln 3	1.09861...	600000000000	14 Jun 2025	Dmitriy Grigoryev
ln 5	1.60943...	600000000000	24 Oct 2025	Dmitriy Grigoryev
ln 7	1.94591...	549755813888	12 Aug 2020	Marco Julian Hummel

== Purpose ==
The tool can serve several purposes. On the one hand, it allows the capabilities of CPUs and RAM to be determined and compared with other models. On the other hand, these hardware components can also be tested for stability and error susceptibility through stress testing. An alternative program for this would be Prime95. The advantage of the program lies in the fact that (partial) calculations can be carried out on an old Pentium PC, an up-to-date workstation, and theoretically even supercomputers, without measured performance falling off a measurement scale (or complex benchmarks becoming incompatible due to new hardware and interfaces). Setting new computing records also represents a contemporary feasibility study and can serve as an indicator of computer performance improvement over time when regularly performed and with similar parameters.

== See also ==
- Super PI – a program that is designed solely to computation of digits of π
- Prime95 – a program for searching of prime numbers
