= Japan Society for Industrial and Applied Mathematics =

Japanese counterpart of the Society for Industrial and Applied Mathematics

- Formation: 1990; 36 years ago
- Headquarters: Tokyo, Japan
- Region served: Japan
- Fields: Applied Mathematics
- Official language: Japanese and English
- Website: www2.jsiam.org/en/

Japan Society for Industrial and Applied Mathematics (JSIAM) is a Japanese non-profit organization for the field of applied mathematics. JSIAM is not a branch but a Japanese counterpart of the Society for Industrial and Applied Mathematics (SIAM) based in the United States.

== Activities ==
As same as SIAM, JSIAM publishes academic journals in Japanese and English, hold academic conferences, and give awards to applied mathematicians with JSIAM membership.

=== English Journals and Publications from JSIAM ===
- SIAM Online Magazine
- JJIAM (Japan Journal of Industrial and Applied Mathematics)
- JSIAM Letters

=== Finance ===
The finance of JSIAM is based on membership fee and support from their corporate sponsors. Their sponsors include Canon, Nissan, NEC, NTT, Hitachi, Fujitsu and Ricoh.

=== Contributions to EASIAM ===
EASIAM (East Asia Section of SIAM)
- Formation: 1998; 28 years ago
- Legal status: Active
- Purpose: Promoting applied mathematics in eastern Asia
- Region served: Japan; China; Hong Kong; Macau; Taiwan; South Korea; Singapore; Philippines; Thailand; Indonesia; Brunei
- Fields: Applied Mathematics
- Official language: English
- Key people: Gilbert Strang (Founder of EASIAM)
- Parent organization: Society for Industrial and Applied Mathematics
- Website: sr3.t.u-tokyo.ac.jp/easiam/

EASIAM (East Asia Section of SIAM) aims to advance the studies of applied mathematics in eastern Asia. As part of the Eastern Asian community, JSIAM is partially supporting EASIAM. Within their support, EASIAM is publishing the East Asian Journal of Applied Mathematics from the Global Science Press, and hold the EASIAM conference every year.

Year	Region	City	EASIAM conference organizers
2019	China	Wuhan	Wuhan University
2018	Japan	Tokyo	University of Tokyo and JSIAM
2017	South Korea	Seoul	Seoul National University
2016	Macau	Taipa	University of Macau
2014	Thailand	Pattaya	Mahidol University
2013	Indonesia	Bandung	Bandung Institute of Technology
2012	Taiwan	Taipei	National Taiwan University
2011	Japan	Kitakyushu	Waseda University and JSIAM
2010	Malaysia	Kuala Lumpur	Malaya University
2009	Brunei	Bandar Seri Begawan	Universiti Brunei Darussalam
2008	South Korea	Daejeon	National Institute for Mathematical Sciences

=== ICIAM 2023 ===
JSIAM has announced that they will be organizing the International Congress on Industrial and Applied Mathematics in 2023 with the Mathematical Society of Japan.

== See also ==
- Japan Society for the Promotion of Science
- Society for Industrial and Applied Mathematics
