= SROP =

SROP may refer to:

- Sigreturn-oriented programming, a computer security exploit technique
- Sydney Region Outline Plan
- McNair SROP Michigan State University
- Schulich Research Opportunities Program
