= VDSO =

Linux kernel mechanism

vDSO (virtual dynamic shared object) is a kernel mechanism for exporting a carefully selected set of kernel space routines to user space applications so that applications can call these kernel space routines in-process, without incurring the performance penalty of a mode switch from user mode to kernel mode that is inherent when calling these same kernel space routines by means of the system call interface.

vDSO uses standard mechanisms for linking and loading i.e. standard Executable and Linkable Format (ELF) format. vDSO is a memory area allocated in user space which exposes some kernel functionalities. vDSO is dynamically allocated, offers improved safety through address space layout randomization, and supports more than four system calls. Some C standard libraries, like glibc, may provide vDSO links so that if the kernel does not have vDSO support, a traditional syscall is made. vDSO helps to reduce the calling overhead on simple kernel routines, and it also can work as a way to select the best system-call method on some computer architectures such as IA-32. An advantage over other methods is that such exported routines can provide proper DWARF debugging information. Implementation generally implies hooks in the dynamic linker to find the vDSOs.

vDSO was developed to offer the vsyscall features while overcoming its limitations: a small amount of statically allocated memory, which allows only four system calls, and the same addresses application binary interface (ABI) in each process, which compromises security. This security issue has been mitigated by emulating a virtual system call, but the emulation introduces additional latency.

glibc has support for getrandom() vDSO.
