= Execution unit =

Part of a CPU which performs the operations instructed by the program

In computer engineering, an execution unit (E-unit or EU) is a part of a processing unit that performs the operations and calculations forwarded from the instruction unit. It may have its own internal control sequence unit (not to be confused with a CPU's main control unit), some registers, and other internal units such as an arithmetic logic unit, address generation unit, floating-point unit, load–store unit, branch execution unit or other smaller and more specific components, and can be tailored to support a certain datatype, such as integers or floating-points.

It is common for modern processing units to have multiple parallel functional units within its execution units, which is referred to as superscalar design. The simplest arrangement is to use a single bus manager unit to manage the memory interface and the others to perform calculations. Additionally, modern execution units are usually pipelined.
