= Load–store unit =

Part of a computer system

In computer engineering, a load–store unit (LSU) is a specialized execution unit responsible for executing all load and store instructions, generating virtual addresses of load and store operations and loading data from memory or storing it back to memory from registers.

The load–store unit usually includes a queue which acts as a waiting area for memory instructions, and the unit itself operates independently of other processor units.

Load–store units may also be used in vector processing, and in such cases the term "load–store vector" may be used.

Some load–store units are also capable of executing simple fixed-point and/or integer operations.

== See also ==
- Address-generation unit
- Arithmetic–logic unit
- Floating-point unit
- Load–store architecture
