= GAPP =

GAPP may refer to:

- General Administration of Press and Publication
- Generally Accepted Privacy Principles, framework for accountants to help manage privacy concerns
- German American Partnership Program
- Geometric-Arithmetic Parallel Processor
- GapP, A complexity class of counting in computer science

== See also ==
- Gapp, a surname
