= David Alan Grier (writer) =

American technology and social policy writer

- Occupations: Writer, Technology Commentator, Associate Professor
- Years active: 2009-present
- Spouse: Jean Heilman Grier

David Alan Grier is a writer active in the field of technology and social policy. He is associate professor of international science and technology policy and international affairs at George Washington University. As a professor, his area of expertise includes globalization, international standardization, scientific institutions, and the history of science. Publications include The Company We Keep. He writes the column Errant Hashtag for the IEEE magazine Computer. A series of podcasts also entitled "Errant Hashtag" discusses the correlation of technology, management, organization, and the society at large. He also writes the monthly column "CS David" for the Communications of the Chinese Computing Federation.

He is also the Executive Producer and Chief Writer of the weekly podcast "How We Manage Stuff." The podcast attempts to take an insightful and yet humorous look at the issues of technology, organization, innovation, work, and creativity. It was launched with Tamara Carleton of the Innovation Leadership Group as co-host.

Grier is considered an expert on the concept of crowdsourcing and the future of the work force on an international scale. His book When Computers Were Human explored early want of using massed labor to process data and showed that most of the ideas of crowdsourcing predated the internet. The book focussed on the story of the Mathematical Tables Project, which was a New Deal agency that hired unemployed clerks and laborers to calculate higher mathematical functions. Between 2009 and 2011, he prepared a series of podcasts on the organization and operation of crowdsourcing. These podcasts were eventually published as the book Crowdsourcing for Dummies. In 2013, he was made a Fellow of the IEEE for his contributions to the field of Crowdsourcing.

He is also the technology principal for the Washington-based consulting firm Djaghe, LLC, alongside his wife, Jean Heilman Grier. Djaghe, LLC works with clients in the United States along with Asia, Europe and South America, on topics dealing with technology and trade issues. He is also a member of the Institute for International Science & Technology Policy of the George Washington University. At the university, he served as Director of University Honors, Assistant Dean of Engineering and Associate Dean of International Affairs. He was the recipient of the 2009 George Washington Award for Contributions to the university and was the 2013 President of the Computer Society of the IEEE.

Grier was raised in Detroit, contemporaneously with the actor David Grier. As a teenager, he worked for Oldsmobile and Burroughs Computer Corporation, where he learned to program. He attended Middlebury College in Vermont, where he studied with the writers Barry Hannah and Tom Gavin, and he spent most of his spare time in the computer center writing a word processor, though he was nominally a mathematics major. He then worked on the Burroughs Scientific Processor Project in Paoli, Pennsylvania. He attended the University of Washington in Seattle, where he received a doctorate in Mathematical Statistics even though he spent much of his spare time doing amateur improv. His breakthrough article was a piece on how the 1989 protestors at Tiananmen Square used the precursor of the Internet to rally their supporters in North America.

== Publications ==
- The Company We Keep (IEEE Computer Society, 2012: ISBN 978-0769547640)
- Too Soon to Tell (John Wiley, 2009)
- When Computers Were Human (Princeton University Press, 2005)
- Crowdsourcing for Dummies (John Wiley, 2013)
