= Van Der Merwe Miszewski Architects =

South African architectural practice

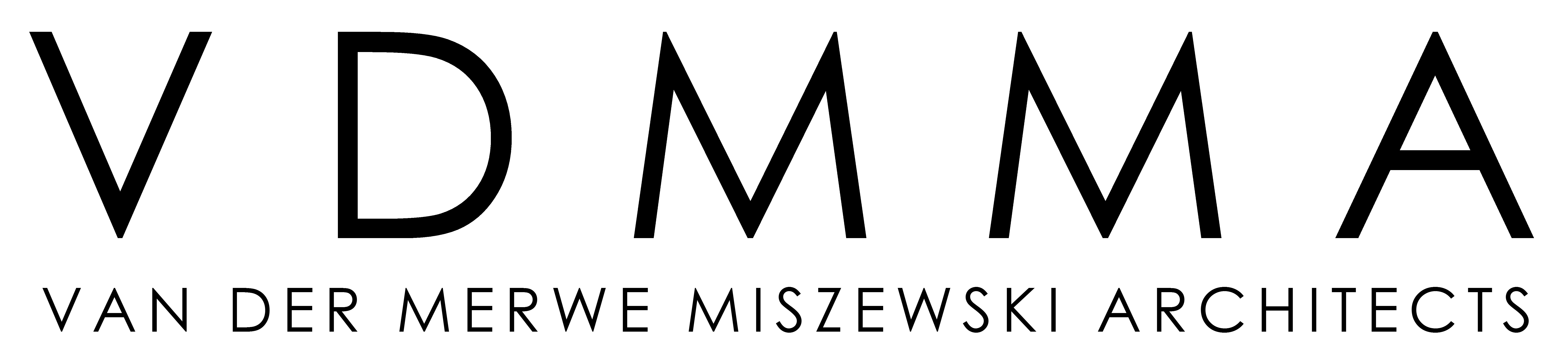

Practice information
- Key architects: Macio Miszewski
- Founded: 1991; 35 years ago
- Location: Cape Town, South Africa

Significant works and honors
- Buildings: The Tree House; V&A Silo Precinct; Allan Gray Headquarters; Zeitz MOCAA; De Beers Headquarters; CTICC; Bridge House; CTICC East; Highveldt House
- Awards: SAIA Award of Excellence; Cifa Award for Architecture; Fulton Steel Award; SAPOA Award; Chicago Athenaeum European Centre for Architecture Award

Website
- www.vdmma.com

Van der Merwe Miszewski Architects (VDMMA) is an architectural practice based in Cape Town, South Africa.

== History ==
The company was founded in 1991 by directors Anya van der Merwe and Macio Miszewski.

Anya van der Merwe and Macio Miszewski met at the University of Cape Town School of Architecture in the early 1980s.

Anya van der Merwe completed the Bachelor of Architecture (BArch) with Distinction in 1984 before moving to London, England, to further her studies at the Architectural Association, from where she graduated with an Architectural Association Graduate Diploma in History and Theory (AAGradDip) in 1987. Anya left VDMMA as director in 2016.

Macio Miszewski obtained a Bachelor of Architectural Studies (BAS) from University of Cape Town in 1984 before also completing an Architectural Association Diploma at the Architectural Association in 1987.

Both Anya and Macio spent two years working at Arup Associates in London, before returning to South Africa in 1990, opening the practice shortly after.

== Selected projects ==
=== Residential ===
- Tree House, Cape Town, South Africa – 1999
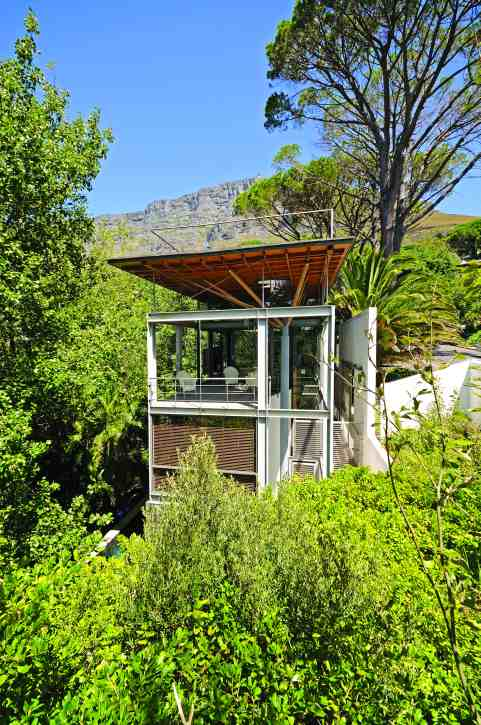
  Tree House Cape Town
- Bridge House, Cape Town, South Africa – 2001
- Light House, apartment building, Cape Town, South Africa – 2005
- Courtyard House, Cape Town, South Africa – 2006
- Highveldt House, Gauteng, South Africa – 2008
- Maison, Franschhoek, South Africa – 2009
- Forest House, Cape Town, South Africa – 2009
- Mountain House, Cape Town, South Africa 2010

=== Corporate ===
- 163 Bree Street, Architect's Office, Cape Town, South Africa – 1996
- BMD Textiles office building, Cape Town, South Africa – 1999
- Jenni Button, retail interior, Cape Town, South Africa – 2003
- De Beers corporate headquarters (lead design in association with Gapp and Lucien le Grange), Johannesburg, South Africa – 2004
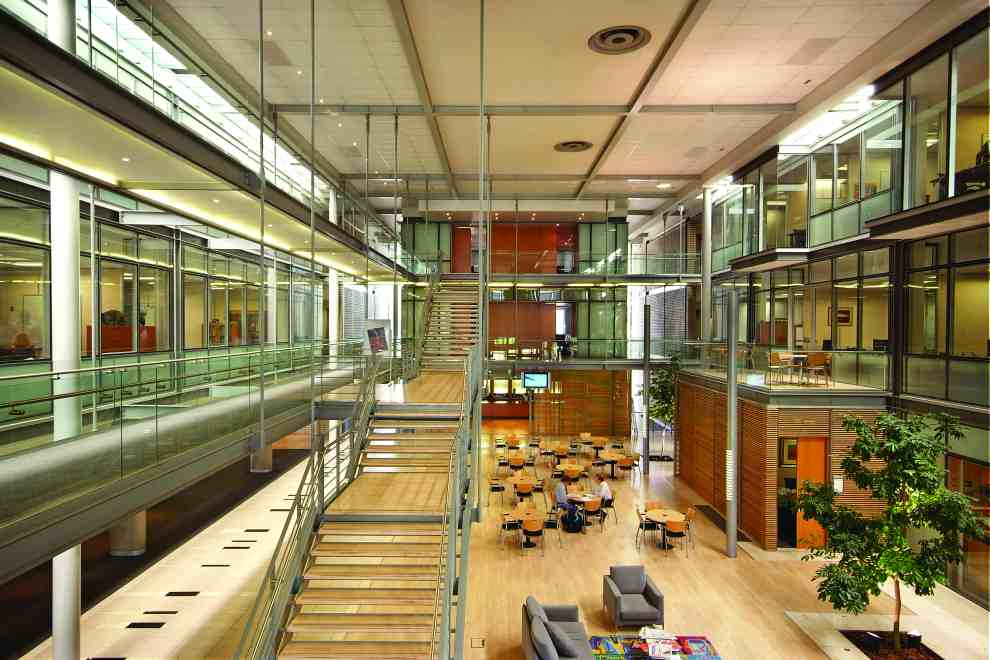
  Interior view De Beers Headquarters Johannesburg
- Hilton Weiner, retail interior, Pretoria, South Africa – 2004
- Exact, retail interior, Durban, South Africa, 2006

=== Public ===
- Cape Town International Convention Center(lead design in association with Foreshore Architects), Cape Town, South Africa – 2003
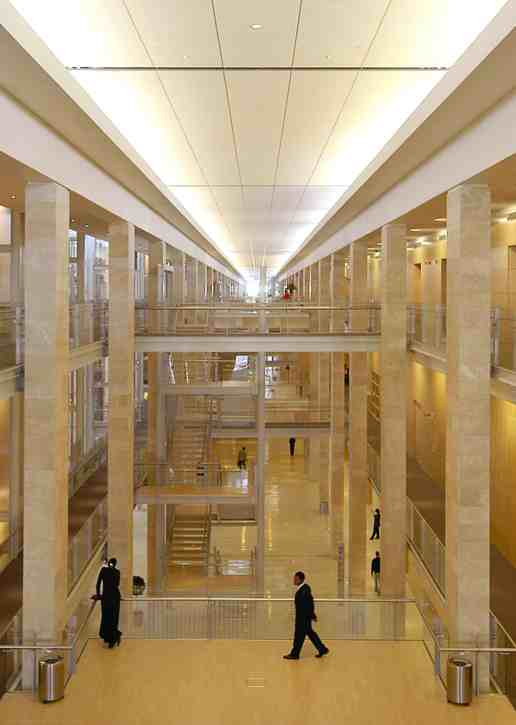
  Interior view Cape Town International Convention Center Cape Town
- Masimbambisane Secondary School, Cape Town, South Africa – 2003
- Gondwana Lodge, Barrydale, South Africa – 2009
- University of Cape Town Student Administration, Cape Town, South Africa – 2010
- University of Cape Town School of Economics, Cape Town, South Africa – 2011

== Awards and competitions ==
The company has been widely recognised and awarded, both in South Africa and internationally.

- South African Institute of Architects "Award of Merit", 1997 for Sun House
- South African Institute of Architects "Award of Merit", 1999 for Tree House
- UK Architectural Record "ar+d" international award competition, 1999 for Tree House
- World Architecture Award, international competition for best built residential project, 2001 for Tree House
- South African Institute for Civil Engineering, merit award, 2004 for Cape Town international Convention Center (lead design is association with Foreshore Architects)
- South African Institute of Steel Construction, national overall winner, 2004 for Cape Town international Convention Center(lead design is association with Foreshore Architects)
- Cape Institute of Architects, award of commendation, 2005 for Cape Town international Convention Center (lead design is association with Foreshore Architects)
- South African Institute of Architects, merit award, 2005 for Cape Town international Convention Center (lead design is association with Foreshore Architects)
- VISI magazine and South African Institute of Architects, "best building in South Africa" in public opinion poll, 2005 for Tree House
- South African Institute of Architects, award of commendation, 2005 for De Beers Corporate Headquarters (lead design in association with GAPP and Lucian le Grange)
- South African Institute of Steel Construction, residential winner, 2009 for Highveldt House
- Chicago Anthenaeum/European Center for Architecture International Architecture award, 2009 for Highveldt House
- Gauteng Institute of Architects, Regional award, 2009 for Highveldt House
- Cape Institute of Architects, Regional award, 2009 for Maison
- 20th Sophia Gray Memorial Lecture Laureate (2008)
