= Silicon Optix =

Silicon Optix Inc
- Company type: Fabless Semiconductor Company
- Founded: 2000; 26 years ago
- Headquarters: San Jose, California (Headquarters)
- Key people: Paul Russo - Founder, Chairman
- Parent: IDT
- Website: www.siliconoptix.com

Silicon Optix Inc was a privately held fabless semiconductor company that designed and manufactured video/image digital processing integrated circuits. Originally a division of Genesis Microchip, Silicon Optix was spun off in 2000 by Paul Russo, the CEO of Genesis Microchip at the time. Silicon Optix acquired Teranex and its patents on the GAPP, which it incorporated into some of their products.

In June 2008, Flexible Picture Systems (FPS) acquired the box systems business from Silicon Optix, and became the exclusive manufacturer and source for the Image AnyPlace video/graphics scaler with Geometry Correction and Edge Blending. Since 2008, Flexible Picture Systems has continued to develop products based on Silicon Optix video processing technology, and introduced the Image AnyPlace-200 in 2009, and OmniScale-200 in 2010.

In October 2008, IDT acquired video processing technology and related assets from Silicon Optix. IDT retains the Silicon Optix REON technology.

In May 2009, Paul Russo's new company GEO Semiconductor Inc acquired the REALTA and GEO technologies of Silicon Optix.

In June 2009, Jupiter Systems acquired the Teranex division (based in Orlando) of Silicon Optix.
