= SWAR =

Parallel processing technique

SIMD within a register (SWAR), also known by the name "packed SIMD" is a technique for performing parallel operations on data contained in a processor register. SIMD stands for single instruction, multiple data.

Many modern general-purpose computer processors have some provisions for SIMD, in the form of a group of registers and instructions to make use of them. SWAR refers to the use of those registers and instructions, as opposed to using specialized processing engines designed to be better at SIMD operations. It also refers to the use of SIMD with general-purpose registers and instructions that were not meant to do it at the time, by way of various novel software tricks.

== SWAR architectures ==
A SWAR architecture is one that includes instructions explicitly intended to perform parallel operations across data that is stored in the independent subwords or fields of a register. A SWAR-capable architecture is one that includes a set of instructions that is sufficient to allow data stored in these fields to be treated independently even though the architecture does not include instructions that are explicitly intended for that purpose.

One of the first historic examples, operational in 1958, was the Lincoln Laboratory TX-2 which had 36-bit wide memory, and instructions that could operate in the ALU on one 36-bit, or on two 18-bit or four 9-bit sub-words. The TX-2 pre-dates the invention of the term SIMD.

An early well-known example of a SWAR architecture was the Intel Pentium with MMX, which implemented the MMX extension set. The Intel Pentium, by contrast, did not include such instructions, but could still act as a SWAR architecture through careful hand-coding or compiler techniques.

Early SWAR architectures include DEC Alpha MVI, Hewlett-Packard's PA-RISC MAX, Silicon Graphics Incorporated's MIPS MDMX, and Sun's SPARC V9 VIS. Like MMX, many of the SWAR instruction sets are intended for faster video coding.

== History of the SWAR programming model ==
Wesley A. Clark introduced partitioned subword data operations in the 1950s. This can be seen as a very early predecessor to SWAR. Leslie Lamport presented SWAR techniques in his paper titled "Multiple byte processing with full-word instructions" in 1975.

With the introduction of Intel's MMX multimedia instruction set extensions in 1996, desktop processors with SIMD parallel processing capabilities became common. Early on, these instructions could only be used via hand-written assembly code.

In the fall of 1996, Professor Hank Dietz was the instructor for the undergraduate Compiler Construction course at Purdue University's School of Electrical and Computer Engineering. For this course, he assigned a series of projects in which the students would build a simple compiler targeting MMX. The input language was a subset dialect of MasPar's MPL called NEMPL (Not Exactly MPL).

During the course of the semester, it became clear to the course teaching assistant, Randall (Randy) Fisher, that there were a number of issues with MMX that would make it difficult to build the back-end of the NEMPL compiler. For example, MMX has an instruction for multiplying 16-bit data but not multiplying 8-bit data. The NEMPL language did not account for this problem, allowing the programmer to write programs that required 8-bit multiplies.

Intel's x86 architecture was not the only architecture to include SIMD-like parallel instructions. Sun's VIS, SGI's MDMX, and other multimedia instruction sets had been added to other manufacturers' existing instruction set architectures to support so-called new media applications. These extensions had significant differences in the precision of data and types of instructions supported.

Dietz and Fisher began developing the idea of a well-defined parallel programming model that would allow the programming to target the model without knowing the specifics of the target architecture. This model would become the basis of Fisher's dissertation. The acronym "SWAR" was coined by Dietz and Fisher one day in Hank's office in the MSEE building at Purdue University. It refers to this form of parallel processing, architectures that are designed to natively perform this type of processing, and the general-purpose programming model that is Fisher's dissertation.

The problem of compiling for these widely varying architectures was discussed in a paper presented at LCPC98.

== Some applications of SWAR ==
SWAR processing has been used in image processing, cryptographic pairings, raster processing, computational fluid dynamics, and communications.

== Examples ==
SWAR techniques can be used even on systems without special hardware support. Logical operations act bitwise, so act on each bit of a register independently. Using addition and subtraction is more difficult, but can be useful if care is taken to avoid unwanted carry propagation between lanes. Except for this carry propagation, one 64-bit addition or subtraction is the same as performing eight 8-bit additions or subtractions.

=== Counting bits set ===
Probably the archetypical example of SWAR techniques is finding the population count of (number of bits set in) a register. The register is treated successively as a series of 1-bit, 2-bit, 4-bit, etc. fields.

To begin with, note that the population count of a 1-bit field is simply the field itself. To find the population count of a 2-bit field, sum the population counts of its two constituent 1-bit fields. This can be done in parallel for 32 2-bit fields in a 64-bit value x:

x2 := (x & 0x5555555555555555) + ((x >> 1) & 0x5555555555555555);

The hexadecimal constant 0x5 is binary 0101_{2}, which isolates even-numbered bits. The addition cannot overflow each 2-bit field, as the maximum possible sum is 2.

This can be repeated to combine 2-bit fields into 4-bit fields. Here, we use a mask of binary 0011_{2}, or hexadecimal 0x3, to isolate pairs of bits:

x4 := (x2 & 0x3333333333333333) + ((x2 >> 2) & 0x3333333333333333);

Now each 4-bit field contains a count from 0 to 4. Because a 4-bit field can contain a value up to 15, no overflow is possible when adding two 4-bit population counts, allowing the masking to be done after the addition, rather than once per addend:

x8 := (x4 + (x4 >> 4)) & 0x0f0f0f0f0f0f0f0f;

At this point, the 8-bit fields can hold values up to 255, so there is no need for further masking until the very end:

x16 = x8 + (x8 >> 8);
x32 = x16 + (x16 >> 16);
x64 = x32 + (x32 >> 32);
population_count = x64 & 0xff;

==== Further refinements ====
There are several well-known variants on this. In particular, the last three shift-and-add steps can be combined into

 population_count = (x8 * 0x0101010101010101) >> 56;

Three stages of shifting and adding require 6 instructions, each with a data dependency on the previous one, so take at least 6 clock cycles. A multiplication can usually be performed faster. When operating on 32-bit words, it's less clear, as a 3-cycle multiply is common.

A second variant is a change to the first step. Rather than combining the two bits b_{1} and b_{0} in each 2-bit field by adding them, consider the initial value of the 2-bit field as 2b_{1} + b_{0}. Subtracting b_{1} from this will produce the desired sum, with only one masking operation:

x2 := x − ((x >> 1) & 0x5555555555555555);

=== Finding zero bytes ===
It is common to search a character string for a null terminator. Doing this one byte at a time is inefficient when a 64-bit processor can operate on 8 bytes at a time.

The same technique can be used to search for pathname separators or other delimiters, by exclusive-oring with the target byte value first.

Some architectures include special instructions for performing 8 byte comparisons at once. For example, the DEC Alpha included a CMPBGE instruction for performing 8 byte compares at once. However, searching for a zero byte can be done without any special support.

One way would be to OR together 8 bits in a manner much like the bit-counting example above:

x2 = x  | x<<1;
x4 = x2 | x2<<2;
x8 = x4 | x4<<4;
byte_map = ~x8 & 0x8080808080808080;

This results in a byte_map with a 1 bit in the most significant bit of any byte that was originally zero.

However, this can be done more quickly by taking advantage of carry propagation using arithmetic operations. Adding 0x7f (binary 01111111_{2}) to each byte causes a carry into bit 7 if the low 7 bits are non-zero. The challenge is ensure the carry propagation stops at bit 7 and does not affect other bytes. This can be done by working on the low 7 bits and high bit of each byte separately. First, extract the low 7 bits of each byte by ANDing with 0x7f before adding 0x7f:

x7 = (x & 0x7f7f7f7f7f7f7f7f) + 0x7f7f7f7f7f7f7f7f;

Then combine with the most-significant bits:

x8 = x7 | x;

This value will have the msbit of each 8-bit field set to 1 if that byte is non-zero. Finally:

byte_map = ~(x8 | 0x7f7f7f7f7f7f7f7f);

will set all the unwanted low bits in each byte, then complement everything, leaving only 1 bits anywhere the corresponding input byte is zero. (This is equivalent to ~x8 & 0x80...80, but uses the same constant value.) If there are no 1 bits, the search can continue with the following word. If there are any 1 bits, the length of the string can be computed from their positions.

==== Further refinements ====
If the goal is limited to finding the first zero byte on a little-endian processor, it is possible to find the least significant zero byte in fewer operations, using two different constants:

x7 = x − 0x0101010101010101;
byte_map = x7 & ~x & 0x8080808080808080;

For each byte b, this sets its msbit in byte_map if the msbit of b − 1 is set and the msbit of b is clear, something that only happens if b = 0.

The preceding statement is only true if there is no borrow in; if there is a borrow, the condition will also be true if b = 1. However, such a borrow can only be generated by a less significant zero byte, so the least significant zero byte will be correctly identified, as desired.

Not only does this save one binary operation, but they are not all sequentially dependent, so it can be performed in two cycles assuming the existence of an "and not" (bit clear) instruction

=== Small table lookups ===
As a generalization of a bitmap, it is possible to store very small lookup tables in a single register. For example, the number of days in a month varies from 28 to 31, a range of 4 values. This can be stored in 12×2 = 24 bits:

days_table = 0xeefbb3 + (is_leap_year << 2);
days_in_month = 28 + (days_table >> 2*month & 3);

(This is assuming a 0-based month number. A 1-based month number can be accommodated by shifting the days_table.)

The fact that the table fits neatly into one register makes it easy to modify for leap years.

== See also ==
- Bit manipulation
- vector processor – Computer processor which works on arrays of several numbers at once
- SIMD engines: array processor, digital signal processor, stream processor.
- SWAR on x86 processors: MMX, 3DNow!, SSE, SSE2, SSE3
