= Active message =

In computing, an active message is a messaging object capable of performing processing on its own. This contrasts with traditional computer-based messaging systems in which messages are passive entities with no processing power.

For example, an active message may send not only the data "5" but also the function that determines what to do with that 5 (such as multiply it by 2).

Active messages can be used to optimize network communications, such as reducing latency by removing software overheads associated with buffering and providing applications with direct user-level access to the network hardware.

== Distributed memory programming ==
Active messages are communications primitive for exploiting the full performance and flexibility of modern computer interconnects. They are often classified as one of the three main types of distributed memory programming, the other two being data parallel and message passing. The view is that Active Messages are actually a lower-level mechanism that can be used to implement data parallel or message passing efficiently.

The basic idea is that each message has a header containing the address or index of a userspace handler to be executed upon message arrival, with the contents of the message passed as an argument to the handler. Early active message systems passed the actual remote code address across the network, however this approach required the initiator to know the address of the remote handler function when composing a message, which can be quite limiting even within the context of a SPMD programming model (and generally relies upon address space uniformity which is absent in many modern systems). Newer active message interfaces require the client to register a table with the software at initialization time that maps an integer index to the local address of a handler function; in these systems the sender of an active message provides an index into the remote handler table, and upon arrival of the active message the table is used to map this index to the handler address that is invoked to handle the message.

Other variations of active messages carry the actual code itself, not a pointer to the code. The message typically carries some data. On arrival at the receiving end, more data is acquired, and the computation in the active message is performed, making use of data in the message as well as data in the receiving node. This form of active messaging is not restricted to SPMD, although originator and receiver must share some notions as to what data can be accessed at the receiving node.

== Integration, usage for micro-services, orchestration, ESB architecture ==
A higher level implementation for active messages is also named Swarm communication in the SwarmESB project. The basic model of the active messages is extend with new concepts and JavaScript is used to express the code of the active messages.

== See also ==
- Remote procedure call

== Sources and external links ==
- https://web.archive.org/web/20070610055547/http://www.tc.cornell.edu/Services/Education/Topics/Parallel/Distributed/%2B6.3%2BActive%2BMessages.htm
- https://github.com/salboaie/SwarmESB/
- GASNet - A communications middleware layer that includes Active Messages and Remote Memory Access (RMA), implemented over a wide variety of network hardware
- AMUDP - Active Messages (AM-2) over UDP (a standard component of the TCP/IP protocol stack)
- AMMPI - Active Messages (AM-2) over MPI
