= Predication (computer architecture) =

Form of conditionals in computer programming

In computer architecture, predication is a feature that provides an alternative to conditional transfer of control, as implemented by conditional branch machine instructions. Predication works by having conditional (predicated) non-branch instructions associated with a predicate, a Boolean value used by the instruction to control whether the instruction is allowed to modify the architectural state or not. If the predicate specified in the instruction is true, the instruction modifies the architectural state; otherwise, the architectural state is unchanged. For example, a predicated move instruction (a conditional move) will only modify the destination if the predicate is true. Thus, instead of using a conditional branch to select an instruction or a sequence of instructions to execute based on the predicate that controls whether the branch occurs, the instructions to be executed are associated with that predicate, so that they will be executed, or not executed, based on whether that predicate is true or false.

Vector processors, some SIMD ISAs (such as AVX2 and AVX-512) and GPUs in general make heavy use of predication, applying one bit of a conditional mask vector to the corresponding elements in the vector registers being processed, whereas scalar predication in scalar instruction sets only need the one predicate bit. Where predicate masks become particularly powerful in vector processing is if an array of condition codes, one per vector element, may feed back into predicate masks that are then applied to subsequent vector instructions.

== Overview ==
Most computer programs contain conditional code, which will be executed only under specific conditions depending on factors that cannot be determined beforehand, for example depending on user input. As the majority of processors simply execute the next instruction in a sequence, the traditional solution is to insert branch instructions that allow a program to conditionally branch to a different section of code, thus changing the next step in the sequence. This was sufficient until designers began improving performance by implementing instruction pipelining, a method which is slowed down by branches. For a more thorough description of the problems which arose, and a popular solution, see branch predictor.

Luckily, one of the more common patterns of code that normally relies on branching has a more elegant solution. Consider the following pseudocode:

if condition
    {do_something}
else
    {do_something_else}

On a system that uses conditional branching, this might translate to machine instructions looking similar to:

    branch_if_condition_to label1
    do_something_else
    branch_always_to label2
label1:
    do_something
label2:
    ...

With predication, all possible branch paths are coded inline, but some instructions execute while others do not. The basic idea is that each instruction is associated with a predicate (the word here used similarly to its usage in predicate logic) and that the instruction will only be executed if the predicate is true. The machine code for the above example using predication might look something like this:

(condition)     do_something
(not condition) do_something_else

Besides eliminating branches, less code is needed in total, provided the architecture provides predicated instructions. While this does not guarantee faster execution in general, it will if the do_something and do_something_else blocks of code are short enough.

Predication's simplest form is partial predication, where the architecture has conditional move or conditional select instructions. Conditional move instructions write the contents of one register over another only if the predicate's value is true, whereas conditional select instructions choose which of two registers has its contents written to a third based on the predicate's value. A more generalized and capable form is full predication. Full predication has a set of predicate registers for storing predicates (which allows multiple nested or sequential branches to be simultaneously eliminated) and most instructions in the architecture have an (optional) register specifier field to specify which predicate register supplies the predicate.

== Advantages ==
The main purpose of predication is to avoid jumps over very small sections of program code, increasing the effectiveness of pipelined execution and avoiding problems with the cache. It also has a number of more subtle benefits:

- Functions that are traditionally computed using simple arithmetic and bitwise operations may be quicker to compute using predicated instructions.
- Predicated instructions with different predicates can be mixed with each other and with unconditional code, allowing better instruction scheduling and so even better performance.
- Elimination of unnecessary branch instructions can make the execution of necessary branches, such as those that make up loops, faster by lessening the load on branch prediction mechanisms.
- Elimination of the cost of a branch misprediction which can be high on deeply pipelined architectures.
- Instruction sets that have comprehensive Condition Codes generated by instructions may reduce code size further by directly using the Condition Registers in or as predication.

== Disadvantages ==
Predication's primary drawback is in increased encoding space. In typical implementations, every instruction reserves a bitfield for the predicate specifying under what conditions that instruction should have an effect. When available memory is limited, as on embedded devices, this space cost can be prohibitive. However, some architectures such as Thumb-2 are able to avoid this issue (see below). Other detriments are the following:

- Predication complicates the hardware by adding levels of logic to critical paths and potentially degrades clock speed.
- A predicated block includes cycles for all operations, so shorter paths may take longer and be penalized.
- An extra register read is required. A non-predicated ADD would read two registers from a register file, where a Predicated ADD would need to also read the predicate register file. This increases Hazards in Out-of-order execution.
- Predication is not usually speculated and causes a longer dependency chain. For ordered data this translates to a performance loss compared to a predictable branch.

Predication is most effective when paths are balanced or when the longest path is the most frequently executed, but determining such a path is very difficult at compile time, even in the presence of profiling information.

== History ==
Predicated instructions were popular in European computer designs of the 1950s, including the Mailüfterl (1955), the Zuse Z22 (1955), the ZEBRA (1958), and the Electrologica X1 (1958). The IBM ACS-1 design of 1967 allocated a "skip" bit in its instruction formats, and the CDC Flexible Processor in 1976 allocated three conditional execution bits in its microinstruction formats.

Hewlett-Packard's PA-RISC architecture (1986) had a feature called nullification, which allowed most instructions to be predicated by the previous instruction. IBM's POWER architecture (1990) featured conditional move instructions. POWER's successor, PowerPC (1993), dropped these instructions. Digital Equipment Corporation's Alpha architecture (1992) also featured conditional move instructions. MIPS gained conditional move instructions in 1994 with the MIPS IV version; and SPARC was extended in Version 9 (1994) with conditional move instructions for both integer and floating-point registers. RISC-V initially had no predication, but in version 2.0 of the unprivileged ISA acquired it through an extension (Zicond) containing conditional zeroing instructions with which conditional arithmetic and selection can be synthesized.

In the Hewlett-Packard/Intel IA-64 architecture, most instructions are predicated. The predicates are stored in 64 special-purpose predicate registers; and one of the predicate registers is always true so that unpredicated instructions are simply instructions predicated with the value true. The use of predication is essential in IA-64's implementation of software pipelining because it avoids the need for writing separated code for prologs and epilogs.

In the x86 architecture, a family of conditional move instructions (CMOV and FCMOV) were added to the architecture by the Intel Pentium Pro (1995) processor. The CMOV instructions copied the contents of the source register to the destination register depending on a predicate supplied by the value of the flag register.

In the ARM architecture, the original 32-bit instruction set provides a feature called conditional execution that allows most instructions to be predicated by one of 13 predicates that are based on some combination of the four condition codes set by the previous instruction. ARM's Thumb instruction set (1994) dropped conditional execution to reduce the size of instructions so they could fit in 16 bits, but its successor, Thumb-2 (2003) overcame this problem by using a special instruction which has no effect other than to supply predicates for the following four instructions. The 64-bit instruction set introduced in ARMv8-A (2011) replaced conditional execution with conditional selection instructions.

== SIMD, SIMT and vector predication ==
Some SIMD within a register (SWAR) instruction sets, like AVX2, have the ability to use a logical mask to conditionally load/store values to memory, in a parallel form of the conditional move. They may also apply individual mask bits to individual arithmetic units executing a parallel operation. One predicate mask bit is available for each sub-word of the SWAR register or each load/store value. This form of multi-bit predication is also used in vector processors at the element level (synonymous with SWAR sub-words):

for each (sub-word i) of SWAR (or Vector) register
    (condition-maskbit i)     do_something(sub-word i)
    (not condition-maskbit i) do_something_else(sub-word i)

Masking is an integral part of Array Processors such as the ILLIAC IV. Array Processors are known today as single instruction, multiple threads (SIMT), and a predicate bit per PE used to activate or de-activate each Processing Element. When the PE has no SIMD within a register instructions, each PE may be individually Predicated:

for each (PE j) // of non-SWAR synchronously-concurrent array
    (active-maskbit j)     broadcast_scalar_instruction_to(PE j)

Modern SIMT GPUs use (or used, but ILLIAC IV documentation termed it "branching") predication to enable/disable individual Processing Elements and, separately and furthermore, to also mask-out sub-words within any given PE's SWAR ALU.

for each (PE j) of SIMT synchronously-concurrent array
  (active-maskbit j) { // broadcast only to active SWAR PEs
    for each (sub-word i) of SWAR register in (PE j)
      (condition-maskbit i)     do_something(sub-word i)
      (not condition-maskbit i) do_something_else(sub-word i)
  }

All the techniques, advantages and disadvantages of single scalar predication apply just as well to the parallel processing case, where the issues associated with branching are made far more complex.

== See also ==
- Branch predictor
- Control flow
- Delay slot
- Instruction-level parallelism
- Optimizing compiler
- Pipeline stall
- Software pipelining
- Speculative execution
- Vector processor
- Very long instruction word
