= Daniel Slotnick =

American mathematician and computer architect

Daniel Leonid Slotnick
- Born: November 12, 1931; New York City
- Died: October 25, 1985 (aged 53); Baltimore, Maryland
- Education: Columbia University
- Scientific career
- Institutions: University of Illinois at Urbana-Champaign
- Thesis: Asymptotic Behavior of Solutions of Canonical Systems Near a Closed, Unstable Orbit (1957)
- Doctoral advisor: Jürgen K. Moser; Kurt Otto Friedrichs

Daniel Leonid Slotnick (November 12, 1931 – October 25, 1985) was an American mathematician and computer architect.

== Education and career ==
Slotnick studied Mathematics at Columbia University, where he obtained a Bachelor's in 1951 and a Master's in 1952.

In 1956 he obtained a PhD at the Courant Institute of Mathematical Sciences of New York University, supervised by Jürgen K. Moser and Kurt Otto Friedrichs.

He worked as professor of computer science at the University of Illinois at Urbana-Champaign.

He was awarded the AFIPS Prize in 1962 and was elected an IEEE Fellow in 1976.

Slotnick died in Baltimore, Maryland, on October 25, 1985, age 53, from an apparent heart attack while jogging.

In 1985, when the Institute for Defense Analyses and National Security Agency formed their supercomputing research facility in the Washington, D.C. area, Slotnick's widow donated his library to them. In 1987 the first issue of The Journal of Supercomputing contained a tribute to Slotnick.

== Research activities ==
Slotnick, in papers published with John Cocke in 1958, discussed the use of parallelism in numerical calculations for the first time. He later served as the chief architect of the ILLIAC IV supercomputer.

He was the principal investigator on a DARPA contract in the early 1970s that produced the ILLIAC IV and the ARPANET. It was a fairly large operation, with its own building on the University of Illinois Urbana-Champaign campus, originally called the Center for Advanced Computation but which is now the Astronomy Building. ILLIAC IV was constructed by the Burroughs Corporation, using special chips made by Fairchild Semiconductor. Because of campus unrest due to the Vietnam war, and the Mansfield amendments, the ILLIAC IV was completed and installed at Ames Research Center instead of the University of Illinois, and Slotnick's DARPA contract was not renewed.

== ARPANET ==
Most of the development of the ARPANET took place at MIT Lincoln Laboratory and BBN Technologies. However, it was planned that ILLIAC IV would be on the network, and some work was funded by Slotnick's DARPA contract. For example, a standard character set was established, and also the Purdy polynomial, a secure hash function to protect passwords on ARPANET. Ironically, when the ILLIAC IV project was moved to Ames Research Center, the computer could only be accessed by telephone.
