= Leading-one detector =

A leading-one detector (LOD) is an electronic circuit commonly found in central processing units and especially their arithmetic logic units (ALUs). It is used to detect whether the leading bit in a computer word is 1 or 0, especially for floating point operations and binary logarithms.
