= Gapp =

Gapp is a surname. Notable people with the surname include:

- Franz Gapp (born 1919), German Luftwaffe pilot
- Jakob Gapp (1897–1943), Austrian Marianist priest
- Paul Gapp (1928–1992), American journalist and architectural critic

== See also ==
- GAPP (disambiguation)
