= MDMX =

Extension to the MIPS architecture

The MDMX (MIPS Digital Media eXtension), also known as MaDMaX, is an extension to the MIPS architecture released in October 1996 at the Microprocessor Forum.

== History ==
MDMX was developed to accelerate multimedia applications that were becoming more popular and common in the 1990s on RISC and CISC systems.

== Functionality ==
MDMX defines a new set of thirty-two 64-bit registers called media registers, which are mapped onto the existing floating-point registers to save hardware; and a 192-bit extended product accumulator.

The media registers hold two new data types: octo byte (OB) and quad half (QH) that contain eight bytes (8-bit) and four halfwords (16-bit) integers.

Variants of existing instructions operate on these data types, performing saturating arithmetic, logical, shift, compare and align operations.

MDMX also introduced 19 instructions for permutation, manipulating bytes in registers, performing arithmetic with the accumulator, and accumulator access.
