= Harvey Cragon =

American engineer

Harvey G. Cragon
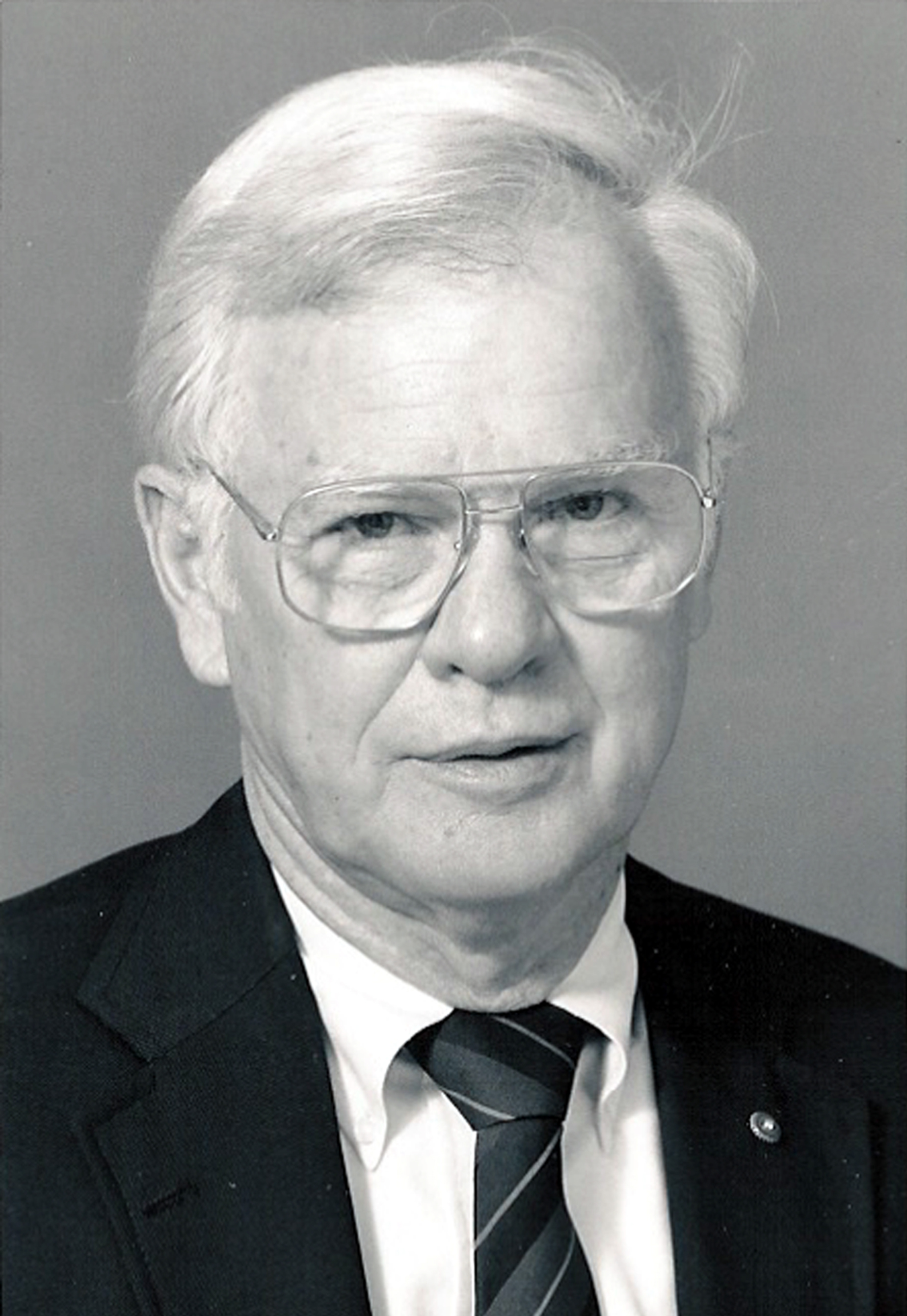
- Born: April 21, 1929; Louisiana, US
- Died: September 7, 2018 (aged 89); Shreveport, Louisiana
- Education: Bachelor of Science in Electrical Engineering, Louisiana Tech University
- Spouse: Henrietta Herbert Cragon
- Parents: Miller M. Cragon, Sr.; Lou Willie Bond Cragon
- Engineering career
- Employers: Hughes Aircraft Company; Texas Instruments; University of Texas at Austin
- Significant design: TI-870 signal processor; TI Advanced Scientific Computer; TMS320 signal processor
- Awards: National Academy of Engineering (1978); IEEE Emanuel R. Piore Award (1984); Eckert–Mauchly Award (1986); Life Fellow of the Institute of Electrical and Electronics Engineers (IEEE); Fellow of the Association for Computing Machinery; Charles Babbage Institute

Harvey G. Cragon (21 April 1929 – 7 September 2018) was an American engineer, who was the Ernest Cockrell Jr. Centennial Chair Emeritus at the Cockrell School of Engineering, University of Texas at Austin.

== Early career ==
In 1950, Cragon graduated with a Bachelor of Science degree in electrical engineering from Louisiana Tech University in Ruston, Louisiana. After graduating, he worked for Southern Bell Telephone Company in New Orleans for a year and then spent two years in the U.S. Army in a unit that tested infrared night vision devices in the Mojave Desert. In 1953, he joined the Hughes Aircraft Company in Los Angeles, where he worked on automated air defense systems. While at Hughes, he took courses at the University of California, Los Angeles. In 1957, he moved to Tennessee, where he worked as an engineer on the digital instrumentation of a wind tunnel at the United States Air Force (USAF) Arnold Engineering Development Center in Tullahoma with a UNIVAC 1102.

== Texas Instruments ==
In 1959, Cragon joined Texas Instruments, Incorporated in Dallas, Texas, to work on applying digital technology to develop processors for a variety of applications, including seismic data analysis. In 1961, he built the first digital computer (and similar digital central processing units) for use on rockets. He led the development of the TI-870 signal processor in the mid-1960s, as well as the construction of a transistorized computer. In 1965 he started the TI Advanced Scientific Computer (ASC), one of the first vector supercomputers. Its main problem was the cooling of the processor, but it was solved well enough for the ASC to be used until 1985. In the 1970s, he led the development of the TMS320 signal processor, which came out in 1983. The TMS320 and subsequent digital signal processors were revolutionary and had a significant impact in the field.

== University of Texas at Austin ==
After twenty-five years with Texas Instruments, Cragon left industry to teach in academia. As the Ernest Cockrell Jr. Centennial Chair in Engineering in the Department of Electrical and Computer Engineering at the University of Texas at Austin from 1984 to 1999, he advised and mentored numerous undergraduate, masters, and doctoral students. He taught courses in computer architecture and wrote three books on the subject.

== Retirement ==
Upon his retirement in 1999, Cragon was named a professor emeritus at UT Austin. He and Henrietta then moved to Dallas, where he became a visiting professor at Southern Methodist University and the University of Texas at Dallas. He continued research on a variety of topics, and wrote books on the development of early computers, including the British code-breaking computer Colossus, the Norden Bombsight, and torpedo data computers developed during World War II.

Cragon died at The Glen, Shreveport, Louisiana on 7 September 2018.

== Bibliography ==
- Brower, William; Cragon, Harvey (1961). Silicon Semiconductor Solid Circuits. Fort Belvoir, VA: Defense Technical Information Center. OCLC 227264353.
- Cragon, Harvey (1980). "The elements of single-chip microcomputer architecture". Computer. 13 (10): 27–41. doi:10.1109/MC.1980.1653373. OCLC 926734875. S2CID 18408406.
- Cragon, H.G.; Watson, W.J. (1989). "The TI Advanced Scientific Computer". Computer. 22 (1): 55–64. doi:10.1109/2.19823. OCLC 926734509. S2CID 11086245.
- Cragon, Harvey (1992). Branch Strategy Taxonomy and Performance Models. Los Alamitos, CA: IEEE Computer Society Press. OCLC 932274307.
- Cragon, Harvey (1999). Memory Systems and Pipelined Processors. Burlington, Massachusetts: Sudbury Jones and Bartlett. OCLC 247575574.
- Cragon, Harvey (2000). Computer Architecture and Implementation. Cambridge, UK: Cambridge University Press. OCLC 859641718.
- Cragon, Harvey (2003). From Fish to Colossus: How the German Lorenz Cipher was Broken at Bletchley Park. Dallas, TX: Cragon Books. OCLC 1123934032.
- Cragon, Harvey (2005). Royal Navy Codes and Ciphers in the Napoleonic Wars. Dallas, TX: Cragon Books. OCLC 668427908.
- Cragon, Harvey (2007). The Fleet Submarine Torpedo Data Computer. Dallas, TX: Cragon Books. OCLC 1083546269.
- Cragon, Harvey (2007). The Eureka Springs Railway: An Automobile Tour into the Past. Dallas, TX: Cragon Books. OCLC 228657355.
- Cragon, Harvey; Remacle, Rosemary (2009-05-28). Cragon, Harvey Oral History (PDF). Dallas, TX: Computer History Museum.
- Cragon, Harvey (2010). How the Norden Bombsight Works from Sighting the Target to Bomb Release. Dallas, TX: Cragon Books. OCLC 1086610207.

== Works cited ==
- "Cragon, Harvey G." WorldCat.
- "In Memoriam: Harvey G.Cragon" (PDF). University of Texas at Austin.
- "Obituary: Harvey G. Cragon". Dallas Morning News.
