= Wolfgang Händler =

German mathematician and pioneering computer scientist

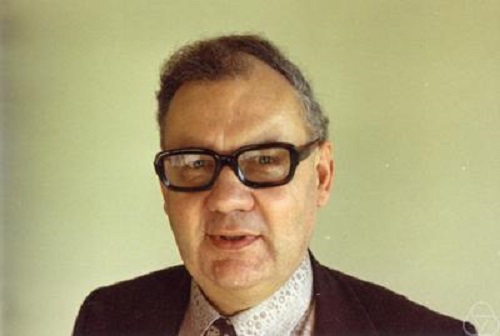
- Wolfgang Händler at Berkeley in 1973
- Born: 11 December 1920; Potsdam, Germany
- Died: 19 February 1998 (aged 77); Germany

Wolfgang Händler (11 December 1920 in Potsdam – 19 February 1998) was a German mathematician, pioneering computer scientist and professor at Leibniz University Hannover (Lehrstuhl für elektronische Rechenanlagen) and University of Erlangen–Nuremberg (Institut für Mathematische Maschinen und Datenverarbeitung) known for his work on automata theory, parallel computing, artificial intelligence, man-machine interfaces and computer graphics.

- Händler diagram (aka M^{n} graph, Händler'scher Kreisgraph, Kreisgraph nach Händler, Händler-Kreisgraph, Händler-Diagramm, Minimisierungsgraph) (1958)

== See also ==
- Händler's minimization graph
- Telefunken
- BESK
- G1 (computer)
- TR 4 (computer)
- SUPRENUM (Supercomputer for Numerical Application)
- Erlangen Classification System (ECS)
  - Feng's classification
  - Flynn's taxonomy
- Alwin Walther
- Wolf-Dieter Keidel
- Arndt Bode
- Arthur Burks
- Konrad Zuse
- List of pioneers in computer science
