= Application-specific instruction set processor =

Processor with an instruction set customized (optimized) for a specific task

An application-specific instruction set processor (ASIP) is a component used in system on a chip design. The instruction set architecture of an ASIP is tailored to benefit a specific application. This specialization of the core provides a tradeoff between the flexibility of a general purpose central processing unit (CPU) and the performance of an application-specific integrated circuit (ASIC).

Some ASIPs have a configurable instruction set. Usually, these cores are divided into two parts: static logic which defines a minimum ISA (instruction-set architecture) and configurable logic which can be used to design new instructions. The configurable logic can be programmed either in the field in a similar fashion to a field-programmable gate array (FPGA) or during the chip synthesis. ASIPs have two ways of generating code: either through a retargetable code generator or through a retargetable compiler generator. The retargetable code generator uses the application, ISA, and architecture template to create the code generator for the object code. The retargetable compiler generator uses only the ISA and architecture template as the basis for creating the compiler. The application code will then be used by the compiler to create the object code.

ASIPs can be used as an alternative to hardware accelerators for baseband signal processing or video coding. Traditional hardware accelerators for these applications suffer from inflexibility. It is very difficult to reuse the hardware datapath with handwritten finite-state machines (FSM). The retargetable compilers of ASIPs help the designer to update the program and reuse the datapath. Typically, the ASIP design is more or less dependent on the tool flow because designing a processor from scratch can be very complicated. One approach is to describe the processor using a high level language and then to automatically generate the ASIP's software toolset.

== Examples ==
RISC-V instruction set architecture (ISA) provides minimum base instruction sets that can be extended with additional application-specific instructions. The base instruction sets provide simplified control flow, memory and arithmetic operations on registers. Its modular design allows the base instructions to be extended for standard application-specific operations such as integer multiplication/division (M), single-precision floating point (F), or bit manipulation (B). For the non-standard instruction extensions, encoding space of the ISA is divided into three parts: standard, reserved, and custom. The custom encoding space is used for vendor-specific extensions.

== See also ==
- Application-specific integrated circuit
- System on chip
- Digital signal processor
- CGRA

== Literature ==
- Dake Liu (2008). Embedded DSP Processor Design: Application Specific Instruction Set Processors. MA: Elsevier Mogan Kaufmann. ISBN 978-0-12-374123-3.
- Oliver Schliebusch; Heinrich Meyr; Rainer Leupers (2007). Optimized ASIP Synthesis from Architecture Description Language Models. Dordrecht: Springer. ISBN 978-1-4020-5685-7.
- Leupers, Rainer; Ienne, Paolo, eds. (2006). Customizable Embedded Processors. San Mateo, CA: Morgan Kaufmann. ISBN 978-0-12-369526-0.
- Gries, Matthias; Keutzer, Kurt, eds. (2005). Building ASIPs: The Mescal Methodology. New York: Springer. ISBN 978-0-387-26057-0.
