= Fujitsu FR =

32-bit RISC processor family

The Fujitsu FR (Fujitsu RISC) is a 32-bit RISC processor family. New variants include a floating point unit and partly video input analog-to-digital converter and digital signal processor. It is supported by Softune, GNU Compiler Collection and other integrated development environments.

== Applications ==
Fujitsu FR are used to control previous versions of Milbeaut signal processors specialized for image processing. Although variants of the 6th generation in 2011 and later generations changed to dual-core ARM architecture, ASSP/ASIC variants with FR controller are continued. They are also used as processor cores inside versions 1 to 3 of the Nikon Expeed image processors (versions 3A and 4 have moved to ARM CPUs).

== See also ==
- SPARClite
- FR-V (microprocessor)
