= SPARClite =

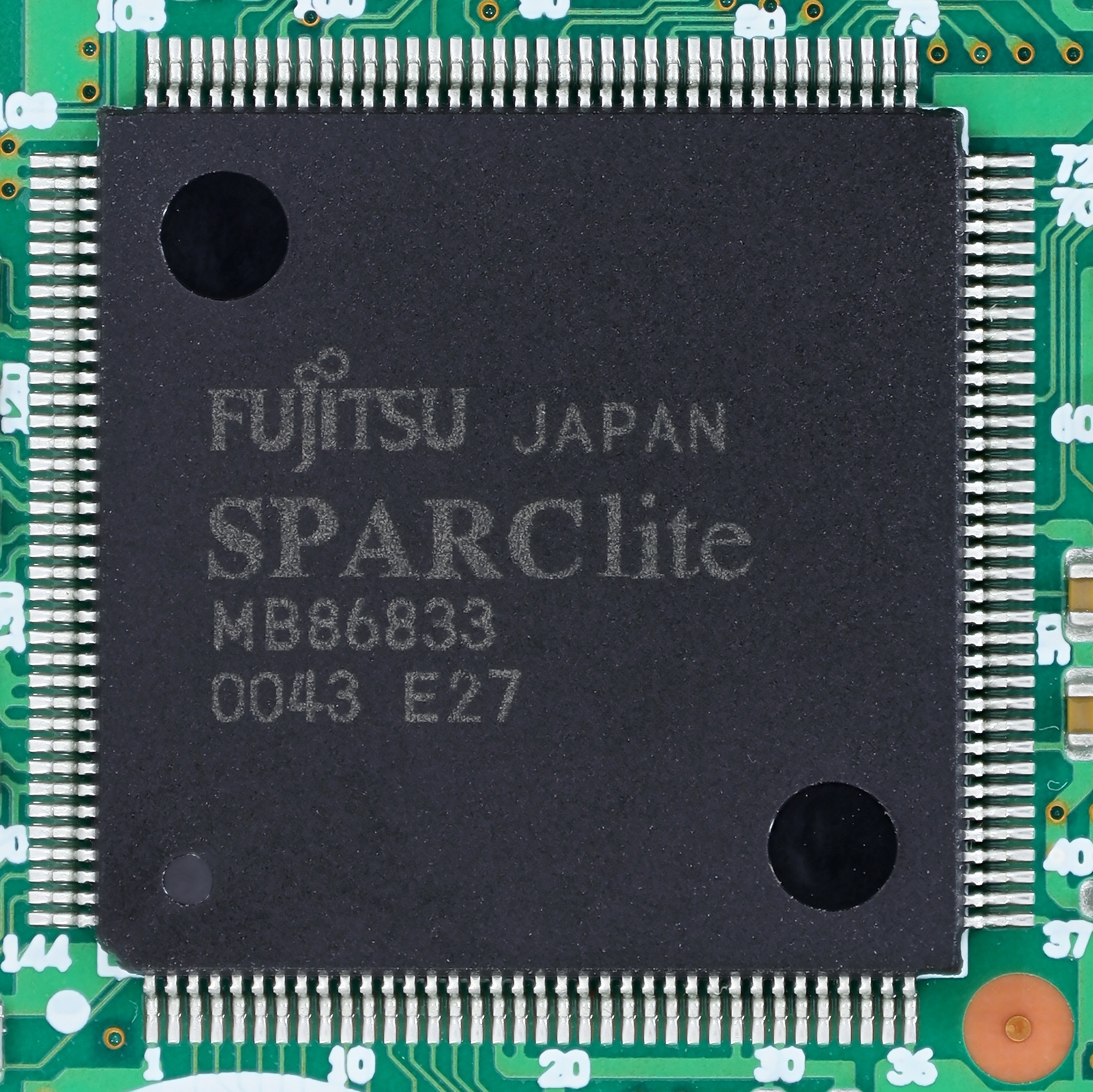
SPARClite MB86833 in an Olympus C-960 ZOOM digital camera

The discontinued SPARClite RISC processor family was based on the 32-bit SPARC V8 architecture. It was manufactured in (approximately) the 1990s by Fujitsu, with the designation MB8683x. It was used in many embedded applications (including a number of early digital cameras). It was followed by the Fujitsu FR and FR-V processors.

== See also ==
- Nikon Expeed
- ITRON project
