= Degree of parallelism =

The degree of parallelism (DOP) is a metric which indicates how many operations can be or are being simultaneously executed by a computer. It is used as an indicator of the complexity of algorithms, and is especially useful for describing the performance of parallel programs and multi-processor systems.

A program running on a parallel computer may utilize different numbers of processors at different times. For each time period, the number of processors used to execute a program is defined as the degree of parallelism. The plot of the DOP as a function of time for a given program is called the parallelism profile.

== See also ==
- Optical Multi-Tree with Shuffle Exchange
