= Fujitsu VP2000 =

The VP2000 was the second series of vector supercomputers from Fujitsu. Announced in December 1988, they replaced Fujitsu's earlier FACOM VP Model E Series. The VP2000 was succeeded in 1995 by the VPP300, a massively parallel supercomputer with up to 256 vector processors.

The VP2000 was similar in many ways to their earlier designs, and in turn to the Cray-1, using a register-based vector processor for performance. For additional performance the vector units supported a special multiply-and-add instruction that could retire two results per clock cycle. This instruction "chain" is particularly common in many supercomputer applications.

Another difference is that the main scalar units of the processor ran at half the speed of the vector unit. According to Amdahl's Law computers tend to run at the speed of their slowest unit, and in this case unless the program spent most of its time in the vector units, the slower scalar performance would make it 1/2 the performance of a Cray-1 at the same speed. The reason for this seemingly odd "feature" is unclear.

One of the major complaints about the earlier VP series was their limited memory bandwidth—while the machines themselves had excellent performance in the processors, they were often starved for data. For the VP2000 series this was addressed by adding a second load/store unit to the scalar units, doubling memory bandwidth.

Several versions of the machines were sold at different price points. The low-end VP2100 ran at an 8 ns cycle time and delivered only 0.5 GFLOPS (about 4-8 times the performance of a Cray), while the VP2200 and VP2400 decreased the cycle time to 4 ns and delivered between 1.25 and 2.5 GFLOPS peak. The high-end VP2600 ran at 3.2 ns and delivered 5 GFLOPS. All of the models came in the /10 versions with a single scalar processor, or the /20 with a second, while the 2200 and 2400 also came in a /40 configuration with four. Due to the additional load/store units, adding additional scalar units improved performance by increasing memory bandwidth, as well as allowing several programs to run at the same time and thereby increase the chance there was something to process on the vector unit. Each unit is said to increase performance 1.5 times, allowing the VP2400/40 to match the performance of the earlier VP2600/20.

The machines were supplied with either the Unix-compatible UXP/M or the MVS-compatible VSP/S operating systems, both supplied by Amdahl. The later was used for Fortran programs while the former was typically used for C, and vectorizing compilers were supplied for both languages.

Like most companies, Fujitsu turned to massive parallelism for future machines, and the VP2000 family were not on the market for very long. Nevertheless, over 100 were sold, and in July 1993, there were 180 installed.

Records
| Preceded by Cray Y-MP/832; 2.144 gigaflops | World's most powerful supercomputer (Fujitsu VP2600/10); 1990–1991 | Succeeded by NEC SX-3/44; 20.0 gigaflops |
