= Chaining (vector processing) =

In computing, chaining is a technique used in vector processors in which vector registers generate interim results which can be used immediately, without additional memory references which reduce computational speed. It is a vector equivalent of the register bypass for scalar operations.

The chaining technique was first used by Seymour Cray in the 80 MHz Cray 1 supercomputer in 1976.
