= Vector processor =

Computer processor which works on arrays of several numbers at once

In computing, a vector processor is a central processing unit (CPU) that implements an instruction set where its instructions are designed to operate efficiently and architecturally sequentially on large one-dimensional arrays of data called vectors. When integrated as a hardware component the vector processor is often called a vector processing unit (VPU). This is in contrast to scalar processors, whose instructions operate on single data items only, and in contrast to some of those same scalar processors having additional single instruction, multiple data (SIMD) or SIMD within a register (SWAR) Arithmetic Units. Vector processors can greatly improve performance on certain workloads, notably numerical simulation, compression and similar tasks.

Vector processing techniques also operate in video-game console hardware and in graphics accelerators but these are invariably Single instruction, multiple threads (SIMT) and occasionally Single instruction, multiple data (SIMD).

Vector machines appeared in the early 1970s and dominated supercomputer design through the 1970s into the 1990s, notably the various Cray platforms. The rapid fall in the price-to-performance ratio of conventional microprocessor designs led to a decline in vector supercomputers during the 1990s.

== History ==
=== Early research and development ===
Array processing development began in the early 1960s at the Westinghouse Electric Corporation in their Solomon project. Solomon's goal was to dramatically increase math performance by using a large number of simple coprocessors under the control of a single master Central processing unit (CPU). The CPU fed a single common instruction to all of the arithmetic logic units (ALUs), one per cycle, but with a different data point for each one to work on. This allowed the Solomon machine to apply a single algorithm to a large data set, fed in the form of an array, leading it to be cited as an example Array processor in Flynn's taxonomy.

In 1962, Westinghouse cancelled the project, but the effort was restarted by the University of Illinois at Urbana–Champaign as the ILLIAC IV. Their version of the design originally called for a 1 GFLOPS machine with 256 ALUs, but, when it was finally delivered in 1972, it had only 64 ALUs and could reach only 100 to 150 MFLOPS. Nevertheless, it showed that the basic concept was sound, and, when used on data-intensive applications, such as computational fluid dynamics, the ILLIAC was the fastest machine in the world. The ILLIAC approach of using separate ALUs for each data element is not common to later designs, and is often referred to under a separate category of massively parallel computing: around 1972 Flynn categorized this type of processing as an early form of single instruction, multiple threads (SIMT).

International Computers Limited sought to avoid many of the difficulties with the ILLIAC concept with its own Distributed Array Processor (DAP) design, categorising the ILLIAC and DAP as cellular array processors that potentially offered substantial performance benefits over conventional vector processor designs such as the CDC STAR-100 and Cray 1.

=== Computer for operations with functions ===
A computer for operations with functions was presented and developed by Kartsev in 1967.

=== Supercomputers ===
The first vector supercomputers are the Control Data Corporation STAR-100 and Texas Instruments Advanced Scientific Computer (ASC), which were first delivered in 1974 and 1972, respectively, though both were originally announced in 1972.

The basic ASC (i.e., "one pipe") ALU used a pipeline architecture that supported both scalar and vector computations, with peak performance reaching approximately 20 MFLOPS, readily achieved when processing long vectors. Expanded ALU configurations supported "two pipes" or "four pipes" with a corresponding 2X or 4X performance gain. Memory bandwidth was sufficient to support these expanded modes.

The STAR-100 was otherwise slower than CDC's own supercomputers like the CDC 7600, but at data-related tasks they could keep up while being much smaller and less expensive. However the machine also took considerable time decoding the vector instructions and getting ready to run the process, so it required very specific data sets to work on before it actually sped anything up.

The vector technique was first fully exploited in 1976 by the famous Cray-1. Instead of leaving the data in memory like the STAR-100 and ASC, the Cray design had eight vector registers, which held sixty-four 64-bit words each. The vector instructions were applied between registers, which is much faster than talking to main memory. Whereas the STAR-100 would apply a single operation across a long vector in memory and then move on to the next operation, the Cray design would load a smaller section of the vector into registers and then apply as many operations as it could to that data, thereby avoiding many of the much slower memory access operations.

The Cray design used pipeline parallelism to implement vector instructions rather than multiple ALUs. In addition, the design had completely separate pipelines for different instructions, for example, addition/subtraction was implemented in different hardware than multiplication. This allowed a batch of vector instructions to be pipelined into each of the ALU subunits, a technique they called vector chaining. The Cray-1 normally had a performance of about 80 MFLOPS, but with up to three chains running it could peak at 240 MFLOPS and averaged around 150 – far faster than any machine of the era.

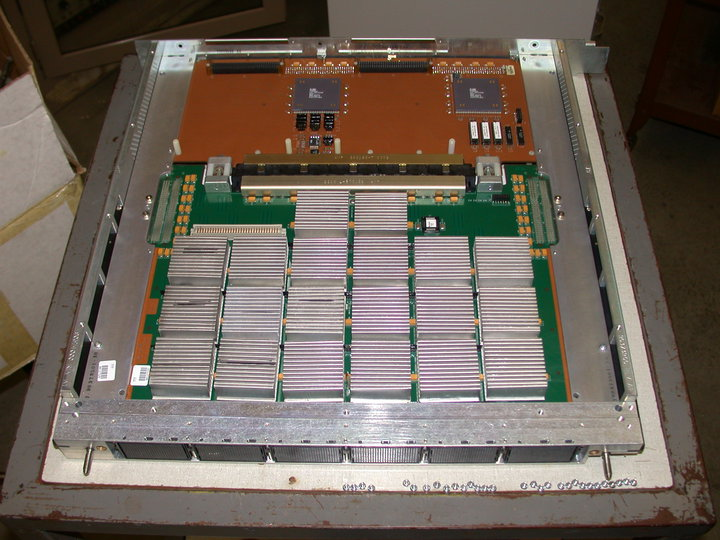
Cray J90 processor module with four scalar/vector processors

Other examples followed. Control Data Corporation tried to re-enter the high-end market again with its ETA-10 machine, but it sold poorly and they took that as an opportunity to leave the supercomputing field entirely. In the early and mid-1980s Japanese companies Fujitsu, Hitachi and NEC introduced register-based vector machines similar to the Cray-1, typically being slightly faster and much smaller: the Fujitsu VP series culminated in the VP2600 holding the world record fastest supercomputer in 1990-1991. Oregon-based Floating Point Systems (FPS) built add-on array processors for minicomputers, later building their own minisupercomputers.

Throughout, Cray continued to be the performance leader, continually beating the competition with a series of machines that led to the Cray-2, Cray X-MP and Cray Y-MP. Since then, the supercomputer market has focused much more on massively parallel processing rather than better implementations of vector processors. However, recognising the benefits of vector processing, IBM developed Virtual Vector Architecture for use in supercomputers coupling several scalar processors to act as a vector processor. IBM also implemented Cray-style Vector processing in the IBM 3090 with an optional vector facility.

Although vector supercomputers resembling the Cray-1 are less popular these days, NEC has continued to make this type of computer up to the present day with their SX series of computers. Most recently, the SX-Aurora TSUBASA places the processor and either 24 or 48 gigabytes of memory on an HBM 2 module within a card that physically resembles a graphics coprocessor, but instead of serving as a co-processor, it is the main computer with the PC-compatible computer into which it is plugged serving support functions.

=== GPU ===
Modern graphics processing units (GPUs) include an array of shader pipelines which may be driven by compute kernels, and being usually SIMT are frequently miscategorised as vector processors, the two being very similar categorisation of SIMD in Flynn's 1972 SIMD taxonomy. GPUs use a strategy for hiding memory latencies as they run into an extreme form of the memory wall. As shown in Flynn's 1972 paper the key distinguishing factor of SIMT-based GPUs is that it has a single instruction decoder-broadcaster but that the cores receiving and executing that same instruction are otherwise reasonably normal: their own ALUs, their own register files, their own Load/Store units and their own independent L1 data caches. Thus although all cores simultaneously execute the exact same instruction in lock-step with each other they do so with completely different data from completely different memory locations. This is significantly more complex and involved than "Packed SIMD", which is strictly limited to execution of parallel pipelined arithmetic operations only. Although the exact internal details of today's commercial GPUs are proprietary secrets, the MIAOW team was able to piece together anecdotal information sufficient to implement a subset of the AMDGPU architecture.

=== Recent development ===
Several modern CPU architectures are being designed as vector processors. The RISC-V vector extension follows similar principles as the early vector processors, and is being implemented in commercial products such as the Andes Technology AX45MPV. There are also several open source vector processor architectures being developed, including ForwardCom and Libre-SOC.

== Comparison with modern architectures ==
As of 2016 most commodity CPUs implement architectures that feature fixed-length SIMD instructions. On first inspection these can be considered a form of vector processing because they operate on multiple (vectorized, explicit length) data sets, and borrow features from vector processors. However, by definition, the addition of SIMD cannot, by itself, qualify a processor as an actual vector processor, because SIMD is fixed-length, and vectors are variable-length. The difference is illustrated below with examples, showing and comparing the three categories: pure SIMD, predicated SIMD, and pure vector processing.

- Pure (fixed) SIMD - also known as "Packed SIMD", SIMD within a register (SWAR), and Pipelined Processor in Flynn's Taxonomy. Common examples using SIMD with features inspired by vector processors include: Intel x86's MMX, SSE and AVX instructions, AMD's 3DNow! extensions, ARM NEON, Sparc's VIS extension, PowerPC's AltiVec, MIPS' MSA, and the Cell processor.
- Predicated SIMD - some SIMD implementations support per-element predication, such as the ARM SVE2 and AVX-512
- Pure vectors - as categorised in Duncan's taxonomy - these include the original Cray-1, Convex C-Series, NEC SX, Fujitsu VP series, IBM 3090 Vector facility and RISC-V RVV. Although memory-based, both the TI ASC and the CDC STAR-100 were vector processors.

Other CPU designs include some multiple instructions for vector processing on multiple (vectorized) data sets, typically known as MIMD (multiple instruction, multiple data) and realized with VLIW (very long instruction word) and EPIC (explicitly parallel instruction computing). The Fujitsu FR-V, for example, combines VLIW features with predication and packed SIMD.

=== Difference between SIMD and vector processors ===
SIMD instruction sets lack crucial features when compared to vector instruction sets. The most important of these is that vector processors, inherently by definition and design, have always been designed to work on variable-length vectors, not restricted to power of two, since their inception.

Pure (fixed-width, no predication) SIMD is often mistakenly claimed to be "vector" (because SIMD processes data which happens to be vectors). Close analysis and comparison of historic and modern ISAs shows actual vector ISAs to have a way to set the vector length at runtime, and to a non-power-of-two quantity. In other words, the number of elements is not hard-encoded in the instruction as it is in SIMD ISA. This is explained in the "SIMD Considered harmful" article.

- the original Cray-1 VL instruction,
- the vsetvl instruction in RISC-V RVV,
- the lvl instruction in NEC SX,
- In the IBM 3090 the equivalent instruction was named VLVCU
- In memory-to-memory systems such as the CDC_Cyber#Cyber_200_series the Vector length was partially encoded in address registers containing the starting point in memory of the Vector. The Cyber 200 Model used the first 16 bits of a 64-bit address to encode the Vector length, for all sources and the destination Vectors.

An additional key feature is element-level predicated masking. In the Cyber 200 Model the element-level bitmask was itself a Vector stored in memory. Some Vector processors have Vector mask registers as exemplified by the Cray-1 which, like the Cyber 200, efficiently used one bit per element as a mask. However other Vector ISAs such as RISC-V elected to use a register from the main Vector register file.

Predicated SIMD (part of Flynn's taxonomy) is comprehensive individual element-level predicate masks on every element, as is now available in ARM SVE2 and AVX-512, but neither of these Instruction sets has an actual explicit "set vector length" instruction. Predicated SIMD uses fixed-width SIMD ALUs but allows locally controlled (predicated) activation of units to provide the appearance of variable length vectors. Examples below help explain these categorical distinctions.

Another key difference: SIMD, because it uses fixed-width batch processing, is unable by design to cope with iteration and reduction. This is illustrated further with examples, below.

==== Vector chaining ====
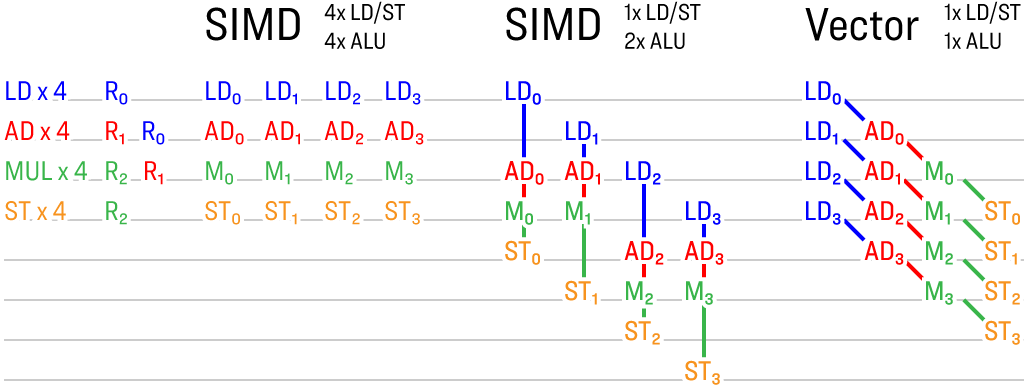

Chaining is a performance technique that allows partial outputs of a vector operation to be used as inputs to a subsequent operation without waiting for the first operation to complete. The technique was first used by Seymour Cray in the 80 MHz Cray 1 supercomputer in 1976.

== Description ==
Computers are able to manipulate one or more pieces of data at a time, by following machine code with predefined meanings (an instruction set). An instruction for addition may, for example, perform what's essentially "add A to B and put the result in C". The data for A, B and C could be—in theory, at least—encoded directly into the instruction. However, in efficient implementation things are rarely that simple. The data is rarely sent in raw form, and is instead "pointed to" by passing in an address to a memory location that holds the data. Decoding this address and getting the data out of the memory takes some time, during which the CPU traditionally would sit idle waiting for the requested data to show up. As CPU speeds have increased, this memory latency has historically become a large impediment to performance; see Random-access memory § Memory wall.

To reduce the amount of time consumed by these steps, most modern CPUs use a technique known as instruction pipelining in which the instructions pass through several sub-units in turn. The first sub-unit reads the address and decodes it, the next "fetches" the values at those addresses, and the next does the math itself. With pipelining the "trick" is to start decoding the next instruction even before the first has left the CPU, in the fashion of an assembly line, so the address decoder is constantly in use. Any particular instruction takes the same amount of time to complete, a time known as the latency, but the CPU can process an entire batch of operations, in an overlapping fashion, much faster and more efficiently than if it did so one at a time.

Vector processors take this concept one step further. Instead of pipelining just the instructions, they also pipeline the data itself. The processor is fed instructions that say not just to add A to B, but to add all of the numbers "from here to here" to all of the numbers "from there to there". Instead of constantly having to decode instructions and then fetch the data needed to complete them, the processor reads a single instruction from memory, and it is simply implied in the definition of the instruction itself that the instruction will operate again on another item of data, at an address one increment larger than the last. This significantly maximises instruction effectiveness.

To illustrate what a difference this can make, consider the simple task of adding two groups of 10 numbers together. In a normal programming language one would write a "loop" that picked up each of the pairs of numbers in turn, and then added them. To the CPU, this would look something like this:

; Hypothetical RISC machine
; assume a, b, and c are memory locations in their respective registers
; add 10 numbers in a to 10 numbers in b, store results in c
  move  $10, count   ; count := 10
loop:
  load  r1, a
  load  r2, b
  add   r3, r1, r2   ; r3 := r1 + r2
  store r3, c
  add   a, a, $4     ; move on
  add   b, b, $4
  add   c, c, $4
  dec   count        ; decrement
  jnez  count, loop  ; loop back if count is not yet 0
  ret

But to a vector processor, this task looks considerably different:

; assume we have vector registers v1-v3
; with size equal or larger than 10
  move   $10, count    ; count = 10
  vload  v1, a, count
  vload  v2, b, count
  vadd   v3, v1, v2
  vstore v3, c, count
  ret

Note the complete lack of looping in the instructions, because it is the hardware which has performed 10 sequential operations: effectively the loop count is on an explicit per-instruction basis.

Cray-style vector ISAs take this a step further and provide a global "count" register, called vector length (VL):

; again assume we have vector registers v1-v3
; with size larger than or equal to 10
  setvli  $10        # Set vector length VL=10
  vload   v1, a      # 10 loads from a
  vload   v2, b      # 10 loads from b
  vadd   v3, v1, v2  # 10 adds
  vstore v3, c       # 10 stores into c
  ret

There are several savings inherent in this approach.

1. Only three address translations are needed. Depending on the architecture, this can represent a significant savings by itself.
2. Another saving is fetching and decoding the instruction itself, which has to be done only one time instead of ten.
3. The code itself is also smaller, which can lead to more efficient memory use, reduction in L1 instruction cache size, reduction in power consumption.
4. With the program size being reduced branch prediction has an easier job.
5. With the length (equivalent to SIMD width) not being hard-coded into the instruction, not only is the encoding more compact, it's also "future-proof" and allows even embedded processor designs to consider using vectors purely to gain all the other advantages, rather than go for high performance.

Additionally, in more modern vector processor ISAs, "Fail on First" or "Fault First" has been introduced (see below) which brings even more advantages.

But more than that, a high performance vector processor may have multiple functional units adding those numbers in parallel. The checking of dependencies between those numbers is not required as a vector instruction specifies multiple independent operations. This simplifies the control logic required, and can further improve performance by avoiding stalls. The math operations thus completed far faster overall, the limiting factor being the time required to fetch the data from memory.

Not all problems can be attacked with this sort of solution. Including these types of instructions necessarily adds complexity to the core CPU. That complexity typically makes other instructions run slower—i.e., whenever it is not adding up many numbers in a row. The more complex instructions also add to the complexity of the decoders, which might slow down the decoding of the more common instructions such as normal adding. (This can be somewhat mitigated by keeping the entire ISA to RISC principles: RVV only adds around 190 vector instructions even with the advanced features.)

Vector processors were traditionally designed to work best only when there are large amounts of data to be worked on. For this reason, these sorts of CPUs were found primarily in supercomputers, as the supercomputers themselves were, in general, found in places such as weather prediction centers and physics labs, where huge amounts of data are "crunched". However, as shown above the efficiency of vector ISAs brings other benefits which are compelling even for Embedded use-cases.

=== Vector instructions ===
The vector pseudocode example above comes with a big assumption that the vector computer can process more than ten numbers in one batch. For a greater quantity of numbers in the vector register, it becomes unfeasible for the computer to have a register that large. As a result, the vector processor either gains the ability to perform loops itself, or exposes some sort of vector control (status) register to the programmer, usually known as a vector Length.

The self-repeating instructions are found in early vector computers like the STAR-100, where the above action would be described in a single instruction (somewhat like vadd c, a, b, $10). They are also found in the x86 architecture as the REP prefix. However, only very simple calculations can be done effectively in hardware this way without a very large cost increase. Since all operands have to be in memory for the STAR-100 architecture, the latency caused by access became huge too.

Broadcom included space in all vector operations of the Videocore IV ISA for a REP field, but unlike the STAR-100 which uses memory for its repeats, the Videocore IV repeats are on all operations including arithmetic vector operations. The repeat length can be a small range of power of two or sourced from one of the scalar registers.

The Cray-1 introduced the idea of using processor registers to hold vector data in batches. The batch lengths (vector length, VL) could be dynamically set with a special instruction, the significance compared to Videocore IV (and, crucially as will be shown below, SIMD as well) being that the repeat length does not have to be part of the instruction encoding. This way, significantly more work can be done in each batch; the instruction encoding is much more elegant and compact as well. The only drawback is that in order to take full advantage of this extra batch processing capacity, the memory load and store speed correspondingly had to increase as well. This is sometimes claimed to be a disadvantage of Cray-style vector processors, and the Fujitsu VP series did make this mistake: in reality it is part of achieving high performance throughput, as seen in GPUs, which face exactly the same issue.

Modern SIMD computers claim to improve on early Cray by directly using multiple ALUs, for a higher degree of parallelism compared to only using the normal scalar pipeline. Modern vector processors (such as the SX-Aurora TSUBASA) combine both, by issuing multiple data to multiple internal pipelined SIMD ALUs, the number issued being dynamically chosen by the vector program at runtime. Masks can be used to selectively load and store data in memory locations, and use those same masks to selectively disable processing element of SIMD ALUs. Some processors with SIMD (AVX-512, ARM SVE2) are capable of this kind of selective, per-element ("predicated") processing, and it is these which somewhat deserve the nomenclature "vector processor" or at least deserve the claim of being capable of "vector processing". SIMD processors without per-element predication (MMX, SSE, AltiVec) categorically do not.

Modern GPUs, which have many small compute units each with their own independent SIMD ALUs, use Single Instruction Multiple Threads (SIMT). SIMT units run from a shared single broadcast synchronised Instruction Unit. The "vector registers" are very wide and the pipelines tend to be long. The "threading" part of SIMT involves the way data is handled independently on each of the compute units.

In addition, GPUs such as the Broadcom Videocore IV and other external vector processors like the NEC SX-Aurora TSUBASA may use fewer vector units than the width implies: instead of having 64 units for a 64-number-wide register, the hardware might instead do a pipelined loop over 16 units for a hybrid approach. The Broadcom Videocore IV is also capable of this hybrid approach: nominally stating that its SIMD QPU Engine supports 16-long FP array operations in its instructions, it actually does them 4 at a time, as (another) form of "threads".

=== Vector instruction example ===
This example starts with an algorithm ("IAXPY"), first show it in scalar instructions, then SIMD, then predicated SIMD, and finally vector instructions. This incrementally helps illustrate the difference between a traditional vector processor and a modern SIMD one. The example starts with a 32-bit integer variant of the "DAXPY" function, in C:

void iaxpy(size_t n, int a, const int x[], int y[]) {
    for (size_t i = 0; i < n; i++) {
        y[i] = a * x[i] + y[i];
    }
}

In each iteration, every element of y has an element of x multiplied by a and added to it. The program is expressed in scalar linear form for readability.

==== Scalar assembler ====
The scalar version of this would load one of each of x and y, process one calculation, store one result, and loop:

loop:
  load32  r1, x      ; load one 32bit data
  load32  r2, y
  mul32   r1, a, r1  ; r1 := r1 * a
  add32   r3, r1, r2 ; r3 := r1 + r2
  store32 r3, y
  addl    x, x, $4   ; x := x + 4
  addl    y, y, $4
  subl    n, n, $1   ; n := n - 1
  jgz     n, loop    ; loop back if n > 0
out:
  ret

The STAR-like code remains concise, but because the STAR-100's vectorisation was by design based around memory accesses, an extra slot of memory is now required to process the information. Two times the latency is also needed due to the extra requirement of memory access.

  ; Assume tmp is pre-allocated
  vmul tmp, a, x, n ; tmp[i] = a * x[i]
  vadd y, y, tmp, n ; y[i] = y[i] + tmp[i]
  ret

==== Pure (non-predicated, packed) SIMD ====
A modern packed SIMD architecture, known by many names (listed in Flynn's taxonomy), can do most of the operation in batches. The code is mostly similar to the scalar version. It is assumed that both x and y are properly aligned here (only start on a multiple of 16) and that n is a multiple of 4, as otherwise some setup code would be needed to calculate a mask or to run a scalar version. It can also be assumed, for simplicity, that the SIMD instructions have an option to automatically repeat scalar operands, like ARM NEON can. If it does not, a "splat" (broadcast) must be used, to copy the scalar argument across a SIMD register:

  splatx4   v4, a        ; v4 = a,a,a,a

The time taken would be basically the same as a vector implementation of y = mx + c described above.

vloop:
  load32x4  v1, x
  load32x4  v2, y
  mul32x4   v1, a, v1  ; v1 := v1 * a
  add32x4   v3, v1, v2 ; v3 := v1 + v2
  store32x4 v3, y
  addl      x, x, $16  ; x := x + 16
  addl      y, y, $16
  subl      n, n, $4   ; n := n - 4
  jgz       n, vloop   ; go back if n > 0
out:
  ret

Note that both x and y pointers are incremented by 16, because that is how long (in bytes) four 32-bit integers are. The decision was made that the algorithm shall only cope with 4-wide SIMD, therefore the constant is hard-coded into the program.

Unfortunately for SIMD, the clue was in the assumption above, "that n is a multiple of 4" as well as "aligned access", which, clearly, is a limited specialist use-case.

Realistically, for general-purpose loops such as in portable libraries, where n cannot be limited in this way, the overhead of setup and cleanup for SIMD in order to cope with non-multiples of the SIMD width, can far exceed the instruction count inside the loop itself. Assuming worst-case that the hardware cannot do misaligned SIMD memory accesses, a real-world algorithm will:

- first have to have a preparatory section which works on the beginning unaligned data, up to the first point where SIMD memory-aligned operations can take over. this will either involve (slower) scalar-only operations or smaller-sized packed SIMD operations. Each copy implements the full algorithm inner loop.
- perform the aligned SIMD loop at the maximum SIMD width up until the last few elements (those remaining that do not fit the fixed SIMD width)
- have a cleanup phase which, like the preparatory section, is just as large and just as complex.

Eight-wide SIMD requires repeating the inner loop algorithm first with four-wide SIMD elements, then two-wide SIMD, then one (scalar), with a test and branch in between each one, in order to cover the first and last remaining SIMD elements (0 <= n <= 7).

This more than triples the size of the code, in fact in extreme cases it results in an order of magnitude increase in instruction count! This can easily be demonstrated by compiling the iaxpy example for AVX-512, using the options "-O3 -march=knl" to gcc.

Over time as the ISA evolves to keep increasing performance, it results in ISA Architects adding 2-wide SIMD, then 4-wide SIMD, then 8-wide and upwards. It can therefore be seen why AVX-512 exists in x86.

Without predication, the wider the SIMD width the worse the problems get, leading to massive opcode proliferation, degraded performance, extra power consumption and unnecessary software complexity.

Vector processors on the other hand are designed to issue computations of variable length for an arbitrary count, n, and thus require very little setup, and no cleanup. Even compared to those SIMD ISAs which have masks (but no setvl instruction), Vector processors produce much more compact code because they do not need to perform explicit mask calculation to cover the last few elements (illustrated below).

==== Predicated SIMD ====
Assuming a hypothetical predicated (mask capable) SIMD ISA, and again assuming that the SIMD instructions can cope with misaligned data, the instruction loop would look like this:

vloop:
  # prepare mask. few ISAs have min though
  min       t0, n, $4     ; t0 = min(n, 4)
  shift     m, $1, t0     ; m = 1<<t0
  sub       m, m, $1      ; m = (1<<t0)-1
  # now do the operation, masked by m bits
  load32x4  v1, x, m
  load32x4  v2, y, m
  mul32x4   v1, a, v1, m  ; v1 := v1 * a
  add32x4   v3, v1, v2, m ; v3 := v1 + v2
  store32x4 v3, y, m
  # update x, y and n for next loop
  addl      x, t0*4      ; x := x + t0*4
  addl      y, t0*4
  subl      n, n, t0     ; n := n - t0
  # loop?
  jgz       n, vloop     ; go back if n > 0
out:
  ret

Here it can be seen that the code is much cleaner but a little complex: at least, however, there is no setup or cleanup: on the last iteration of the loop, the predicate mask will be set to either 0b0000, 0b0001, 0b0011, 0b0111 or 0b1111, resulting in between 0 and 4 SIMD element operations being performed, respectively. One additional potential complication: some RISC ISAs do not have a "min" instruction, needing instead to use a branch or scalar predicated compare.

It is clear how predicated SIMD at least merits the term "vector capable", because it can cope with variable-length vectors by using predicate masks. The final evolving step to a "true" vector ISA, however, is to not have any evidence in the ISA at all of a SIMD width, leaving that entirely up to the hardware.

==== Pure (true) vector ISA ====
For Cray-style vector ISAs such as RVV, an instruction called "setvl" (set vector length) is used. The hardware first defines how many data values it can process in one "vector": this could be either actual registers or it could be an internal loop (the hybrid approach, mentioned above). This maximum amount (the number of hardware "lanes") is termed "MVL" (Maximum Vector Length). Note that, as seen in SX-Aurora and Videocore IV, MVL may be an actual hardware lane quantity or a virtual one. (Note: As mentioned in the ARM SVE2 Tutorial, programmers must not make the mistake of assuming a fixed vector width: consequently MVL is not a quantity that the programmer needs to know. This can be a little disconcerting after years of SIMD mindset).

On calling setvl with the number of outstanding data elements to be processed, "setvl" is permitted (essentially required) to limit that to the Maximum Vector Length (MVL) and thus returns the actual number that can be processed by the hardware in subsequent vector instructions, and sets the internal special register, "VL", to that same amount. ARM refers to this technique as "vector length agnostic" programming in its tutorials on SVE2.

Below is the Cray-style vector assembler for the same SIMD style loop, above. Note that t0 (which, containing a convenient copy of VL, can vary) is used instead of hard-coded constants:

vloop:
  setvl   t0, n      # VL=t0=min(MVL, n)
  vld32   v0, x      # load vector x
  vld32   v1, y      # load vector y
  vmadd32 v1, v0, a  # v1 += v0 * a
  vst32   v1, y      # store Y
  add     y, t0*4    # advance y by VL*4
  add     x, t0*4    # advance x by VL*4
  sub     n, t0      # n -= VL (t0)
  bnez    n, vloop   # repeat if n != 0

This is essentially not very different from the SIMD version (processes 4 data elements per loop if MVL is 4), or from the initial Scalar version (processes just the one). n still contains the number of data elements remaining to be processed, but t0 contains the copy of VL – the number that is going to be processed in each iteration. t0 is subtracted from n after each iteration, and if n is zero then all elements have been processed.

A number of things to note, when comparing against the Predicated SIMD assembly variant:

1. The setvl instruction has embedded within it a min instruction
2. Where the SIMD variant hard-coded both the width (4) into the creation of the mask and in the SIMD width (load32x4 etc.) the vector ISA equivalents have no such limit. This makes vector programs both portable, Vendor Independent, and future-proof.
3. Setting VL effectively creates a hidden predicate mask that is automatically applied to the vectors
4. Where with predicated SIMD the mask bitlength is limited to that which may be held in a scalar (or special mask) register, vector ISA's mask registers have no such limitation. Cray-I vectors could be just over 1,000 elements (in 1977).

Thus it can be seen, very clearly, how vector ISAs reduce the number of instructions.

Also note, that just like the predicated SIMD variant, the pointers to x and y are advanced by t0 times four because they both point to 32 bit data, but that n is decremented by straight t0. Compared to the fixed-size SIMD assembler there is very little apparent difference: x and y are advanced by hard-coded constant 16, n is decremented by a hard-coded 4, so initially it is hard to appreciate the significance. The difference comes in the realisation that the vector hardware could be capable of doing 4 simultaneous operations, or 64, or 10,000, it would be the exact same vector assembler for all of them and there would still be no SIMD cleanup code. Even compared to the predicate-capable SIMD, it is still more compact, clearer, more elegant and uses less resources.

Not only is it a much more compact program (saving on L1 Cache size), but as previously mentioned, the vector version can issue far more data processing to the ALUs, again saving power because Instruction Decode and Issue can sit idle.

Additionally, the number of elements going in to the function can start at zero. This sets the vector length to zero, which effectively disables all vector instructions, turning them into no-ops, at runtime. Thus, unlike non-predicated SIMD, even when there are no elements to process there is still no wasted cleanup code, or preamble: not even when n=0.

==== IBM 370 Vector facility ====
In the IBM 3090 an additional benefit (further reduction in instruction count) was achieved.

  VLVCU GR4          # Load VCT, update GR4 & CCode
vloop:
  vld32   v0, x, v0  # load vector x, update v0
  vld32   v1, y      # load vector y (no update v1)
  vmadd32 v1, v0, a  # v1 += v0 * a
  vst32   v1, y, v1  # store Y, now update v1
  VLVCU GR4          # Load VCT, update GR4 & CCode
  BC 3,vloop         # Branch back if VCT>0

The VLVCU instruction would not only set the Vector Count Length (VCT) but it would then subtract the new Vector Length from the Scalar register and update a Condition Code that the Branch could test. In effect VLVCU combined two (three if including Condition Code setting) into one:

  # IBM 370 VLVCU does the following:
  setvl   GR4      # VL=min(MVL, GR4)
  sub     GR4, VL  # n -= VL (GR4), also set CC

Further, both the Vector-Load and Vector-Store instructions could perform the update of the address registers, saving on explicit instructions to perform address-calculations that in effect had already been done, behind the scenes, when loading/storing each element of the Vector.

The exact same principle is used in Libre-SOC, illustrated with a DAXPY (64-bit floating-point) example:

# r5: n count;   r6: x ptr;   r7: y ptr;   fp1: a
    mtctr 5                # move n to CTR
vloop:
    setvl MAXVL=32,VL=CTR  # actually VL=MIN(MAXVL,CTR)
    # DAXPY is 8-byte, hence 8(r6) and 8(r7)
    sv.lfdup   *32,8(r6)   # load x into fp32-63, incr x
    sv.lfd/els *64,8(r7)   # load y into fp64-95, NO INC
    sv.fmadd *64,*64,1,*32 # (*y) = (*y) * (*x) + a
    sv.stfdup  *64,8(r7)   # store at y, post-incr y
    sv.bc/ctr vloop        # decr CTR by VL, jump !zero

Post-update modes are added to Vectorised versions of Load-with-Update and Store-with-Update, again saving on the need for a separate instruction for address computation when the CPU's Load/Store internals has already done it. Note again that as with the IBM 370 example: the Vector y address is updated by the Store-with-Update, not a Load-with-Update. The Power ISA CTR register is used for the total count instead of a scalar register, and the sv.bc/CTR instruction performs the reduction of CTR by the current Vector Length (VL) followed by testing CTR for being zero and branching if it is not.

The approach is different but achieves the same end-result as the IBM 3090: a significant compacting of instructions that are already considered highly compact. a RISC-V Vector DAXPY inner loop example is 10 instructions, where Libre-SOC and IBM 370 as shown above are both 6: a 40% reduction.

=== Vector reduction example ===
This example starts with an algorithm which involves reduction. Just as with the previous example, it will be first shown in scalar instructions, then SIMD, and finally vector instructions, starting in c:

void (size_t n, int a, const int x[]) {
    int y = 0;
    for (size_t i = 0; i < n; i++)
        y += x[i];
    return y;
}

Here, an accumulator (y) is used to sum up all the values in the array, x.

==== Scalar assembler ====
The scalar version of this would load each of x, add it to y, and loop:

  set     y, 0     ; y initialised to zero
loop:
  load32  r1, x    ; load one 32bit data
  add32   y, y, r1 ; y := y + r1
  addl    x, x, $4 ; x := x + 4
  subl    n, n, $1 ; n := n - 1
  jgz     n, loop  ; loop back if n > 0
out:
  ret y            ; returns result, y

This is very straightforward. "y" starts at zero, 32 bit integers are loaded one at a time into r1, added to y, and the address of the array "x" moved on to the next element in the array.

==== SIMD reduction ====
This is where the problems start. SIMD by design is incapable of doing arithmetic operations "inter-element". Element 0 of one SIMD register may be added to Element 0 of another register, but Element 0 may not be added to anything other than another Element 0. This places some severe limitations on potential implementations. For simplicity it can be assumed that n is exactly 8:

  addl      r3, x, $16 ; for 2nd 4 of x
  load32x4  v1, x      ; first 4 of x
  load32x4  v2, r3     ; 2nd 4 of x
  add32x4   v1, v2, v1 ; add 2 groups

At this point four adds have been performed:

- x[0]+x[4] - First SIMD ADD: element 0 of first group added to element 0 of second group
- x[1]+x[5] - Second SIMD ADD: element 1 of first group added to element 1 of second group
- x[2]+x[6] - Third SIMD ADD: element 2 of first group added to element 2 of second group
- x[3]+x[7] - Fourth SIMD ADD: element 3 of first group added to element 3 of second group

but with 4-wide SIMD being incapable by design of adding x[0]+x[1] for example, things go rapidly downhill just as they did with the general case of using SIMD for general-purpose IAXPY loops. To sum the four partial results, two-wide SIMD can be used, followed by a single scalar add, to finally produce the answer, but, frequently, the data must be transferred out of dedicated SIMD registers before the last scalar computation can be performed.

Even with a general loop (n not fixed), the only way to use 4-wide SIMD is to assume four separate "streams", each offset by four elements. Finally, the four partial results have to be summed. The problems compound as the SIMD hardware width increases (an entirely new set of instruction is introduced), and, worse, some instructions to do Horizontal-sum such as the AMD XOP_instruction_set, were removed after a few years. Some techniques involve shuffle: examples online that involve highly detailed knowledge can be found for AVX-512 and SSE of how to do "Horizontal Sum"

Aside from the size of the program and the complexity, an additional potential problem arises if floating-point computation is involved: the fact that the values are not being summed in strict order (four partial results) could result in rounding errors.

==== Vector ISA reduction ====
Vector instruction sets have arithmetic reduction operations built-in to the ISA. If it is assumed that n is less or equal to the maximum vector length, only three instructions are required:

  setvl      t0, n  # VL=t0=min(MVL, n)
  vld32      v0, x  # load vector x
  vredadd32  y, v0  # reduce-add into y

The code when n is larger than the maximum vector length is not that much more complex, and is a similar pattern to the first example ("IAXPY").

  set     y, 0
vloop:
  setvl   t0, n      # VL=t0=min(MVL, n)
  vld32   v0, x      # load vector x
  vredadd32 y, y, v0 # add all x into y
  add     x, t0*4    # advance x by VL*4
  sub     n, t0      # n -= VL (t0)
  bnez    n, vloop   # repeat if n != 0
  ret y

The simplicity of the algorithm is stark in comparison to SIMD. Again, just as with the IAXPY example, the algorithm is length-agnostic (even on Embedded implementations where maximum vector length could be only one).

Implementations in hardware may, if they are certain that the right answer will be produced, perform the reduction in parallel. Some vector ISAs offer a parallel reduction mode as an explicit option, for when the programmer knows that any potential rounding errors do not matter, and low latency is critical.

This example again highlights a key critical fundamental difference between true vector processors and those SIMD processors, including most commercial GPUs, which are inspired by features of vector processors.

=== Insights from examples ===
Compared to any SIMD processor claiming to be a vector processor, the order of magnitude reduction in program size is almost shocking. However, this level of elegance at the ISA level has quite a high price tag at the hardware level:

1. From the IAXPY example, it can be seen that unlike SIMD processors, which can simplify their internal hardware by avoiding dealing with misaligned memory access, a vector processor cannot get away with such simplification: algorithms are written which inherently rely on Vector Load and Store being successful, regardless of alignment of the start of the vector.
2. Whilst from the reduction example it can be seen that, aside from permute instructions, SIMD by definition avoids inter-lane operations entirely (element 0 can only be added to another element 0), vector processors tackle this head-on. What programmers are forced to do in software (using shuffle and other tricks, to swap data into the right "lane") vector processors must do in hardware, automatically.

Overall then there is a choice to either have

1. complex software and simplified hardware (SIMD)
2. simplified software and complex hardware (vector processors)

These stark differences are what distinguishes a vector processor from one that has SIMD.

== Vector processor features ==
Where many SIMD ISAs borrow or are inspired by the list below, typical features that a vector processor will have are:

- Vector Load and Store – Vector architectures with a register-to-register design (analogous to load–store architectures for scalar processors) have instructions for transferring multiple elements between the memory and the vector registers. Typically, multiple addressing modes are supported.
  - The unit-stride addressing mode is essential: elements are contiguous.
  - modern vector architectures typically also support arbitrary constant strides (offsets)
  - modern architectures also have the scatter/gather (also called indexed) addressing modes.
  - Advanced architectures may also include support for segment load and stores,. Segment loads read a vector from memory, where each element is a data structure containing multiple members. The members are extracted from data structure (element), and each extracted member is placed into a different vector register.
  - Some advanced architectures have fail-first variants of the standard vector load and stores (explained below)
  - IBM 370 also had sparse Vector load/store which used a bitmask to specify, sequentially, which elements to Load / Store: in effect the Compress/Expand concept but Memory-register instead of (below) Register-register.
- Masked Operations – predicate masks allow parallel if/then/else constructs without resorting to branches. This allows code with conditional statements to be vectorized.
- Compress and Expand – usually using a bit-mask, data is linearly compressed or expanded (redistributed) based on whether bits in the mask are set or clear, whilst always preserving the sequential order and never duplicating values (unlike Gather-Scatter aka permute). These instructions feature in AVX-512.
- Register Gather, Scatter (aka permute) – a less restrictive more generic variation of the compress/expand theme which instead takes one vector to specify the indices to use to "reorder" another vector. Gather/scatter is more complex to implement than compress/expand, and, being inherently non-sequential, can interfere with vector chaining. Not to be confused with Gather-scatter Memory Load/Store modes, Gather/scatter vector operations act on the vector registers, and are often termed a permute instruction instead.
- Splat and Extract – useful for interaction between scalar and vector, these broadcast a single value across a vector, or extract one item from a vector, respectively.
- Iota – a very simple and strategically useful instruction which drops sequentially-incrementing immediates into successive elements. Usually starts from zero.
- Reduction and Iteration – operations that perform mapreduce on a vector (for example, find the one maximum value of an entire vector, or sum all elements). Iteration is of the form x[i] = y[i] + x[i-1] where Reduction is of the form x = y[0] + y[1]… + y[n-1]
- Matrix Multiply support – either by way of algorithmically loading data from memory, or reordering (remapping) the normally linear access to vector elements, or providing "Accumulators", arbitrary-sized matrices may be efficiently processed. IBM POWER10 provides MMA instructions although for arbitrary Matrix widths that do not fit the exact SIMD size data repetition techniques are needed which is wasteful of register file resources. NVidia provides a high-level Matrix CUDA API although the internal details are not available. The most resource-efficient technique is in-place reordering of access to otherwise linear vector data.
- Advanced Math formats – often includes Galois field arithmetic, but can include binary-coded decimal or decimal fixed-point, and support for much larger (arbitrary precision) arithmetic operations by supporting parallel carry-in and carry-out
- Bit manipulation – including vectorised versions of bit-level permutation operations, bitfield insert and extract, centrifuge operations, population count, and many others.

=== GPU vector processing features ===
With many 3D shader applications needing trigonometric operations as well as short vectors for common operations (RGB, ARGB, XYZ, XYZW) support for the following is typically present in modern GPUs, in addition to those found in vector processors:

- Sub-vectors – elements may typically contain two, three or four sub-elements (vec2, vec3, vec4) where any given bit of a predicate mask applies to the whole vec2/3/4, not the elements in the sub-vector. Sub-vectors are also introduced in RISC-V RVV (termed "LMUL"). Subvectors are a critical integral part of the Vulkan SPIR-V spec.
- Sub-vector swizzle – aka "lane shuffling" which allows sub-vector inter-element computations without needing extra (costly, wasteful) instructions to move the sub-elements into the correct SIMD "lanes" and also saves predicate mask bits. Effectively an in-flight mini-permute of the sub-vector, this heavily features in 3D shader binaries (as high as 20% of all instructions) and is sufficiently important as to be part of the Vulkan SPIR-V spec. The Broadcom Videocore IV uses the "lane rotate" terminology where the rest of the industry uses the term "swizzle".
- Transcendentals – trigonometric operations such as sine, cosine and logarithm obviously feature much more predominantly in 3D than in many demanding HPC workloads. Of interest, however, is that speed is far more important than accuracy in 3D for GPUs, where computation of pixel coordinates simply do not require high precision. The Vulkan specification recognises this and sets surprisingly low accuracy requirements, so that GPU Hardware can reduce power usage. The concept of reducing accuracy where it is simply not needed is explored in the MIPS-3D extension.

=== Fault (or fail) first ===
Introduced in ARM SVE2 and RISC-V RVV is the concept of speculative sequential vector loads. ARM SVE2 has a special register named "First Fault Register", where RVV modifies (truncates) the vector length (VL).

The basic principle of ffirst is to attempt a large sequential vector load, but to allow the hardware to arbitrarily truncate the actual amount loaded to either the amount that would succeed without raising a memory fault or simply to an amount (greater than zero) that is most convenient. The important factor is that subsequent instructions are notified or may determine exactly how many loads actually succeeded, using that quantity to only carry out work on the data that has actually been loaded.

Contrast this situation with SIMD, which is a fixed (inflexible) load width and fixed data processing width, unable to cope with loads that cross page boundaries, and even if they were they are unable to adapt to what actually succeeded, yet, paradoxically, if the SIMD program were to even attempt to find out in advance (in each inner loop, every time) what might optimally succeed, those instructions only serve to hinder performance because they would, by necessity, be part of the critical inner loop.

This begins to hint at the reason why ffirst is so innovative, and is best illustrated by memcpy or strcpy when implemented with standard 128-bit non-predicated non-ffirst SIMD. For IBM POWER9 the number of hand-optimised instructions to implement strncpy is in excess of 240. By contrast, the same strncpy routine in hand-optimised RVV assembler is a mere 22 instructions.

The above SIMD example could potentially fault and fail at the end of memory, due to attempts to read too many values: it could also cause significant numbers of page or misaligned faults by similarly crossing over boundaries. In contrast, by allowing the vector architecture the freedom to decide how many elements to load, the first part of a strncpy, if beginning initially on a sub-optimal memory boundary, may return just enough loads such that on subsequent iterations of the loop the batches of vectorised memory reads are optimally aligned with the underlying caches and virtual memory arrangements. Additionally, the hardware may choose to use the opportunity to end any given loop iteration's memory reads exactly on a page boundary (avoiding a costly second TLB lookup), with speculative execution preparing the next virtual memory page whilst data is still being processed in the current loop. All of this is determined by the hardware, not the program itself.

== Performance and speed up ==
Let r be the vector speed ratio and f be the vectorization ratio. If the time taken for the vector unit to add an array of 64 numbers is 10 times faster than its equivalent scalar counterpart, r = 10. Also, if the total number of operations in a program is 100, out of which only 10 are scalar (after vectorization), then f = 0.9, i.e., 90% of the work is done by the vector unit. It follows the achievable speed up of:

$r/[(1-f)*r+f]$

So, even if the performance of the vector unit is very high ($r=\infty$) there is a speedup less than $1/(1-f)$, which suggests that the ratio f is crucial to the performance. This ratio depends on the efficiency of the compilation like adjacency of the elements in memory.

== See also ==
- Automatic vectorization
- Barrel processor
- Chaining (vector processing)
- Coarse-grained reconfigurable array
- Compute kernel
- Computer for operations with functions
- Duncan's taxonomy on pipelined vector processors
- GPGPU
- History of supercomputing
- RISC-V, an open ISA standard with an associated variable-width vector extension.
- Stream processing
- Supercomputer architecture
- SX architecture
- Tensor Processing Unit
