= List of representations of e =

The mathematical constant e can be represented in a variety of ways as a real number. Since e is an irrational number (see proof that e is irrational), it cannot be represented as the quotient of two integers, but it can be represented as a continued fraction. Using calculus, e may also be represented as an infinite series, infinite product, or other types of limit of a sequence.

== As a continued fraction ==
Euler proved that the number e is represented as the infinite simple continued fraction (sequence A003417 in the OEIS):

$$\begin{align}
e & = [2; 1, 2, 1, 1, 4, 1, 1, 6, 1, 1, 8, 1, \ldots, 1, 2n, 1, \ldots] \\[8pt]
& = 2 + \cfrac1{1 + \cfrac1{2 + \cfrac1{1 + \cfrac1{1 + \cfrac1{4 + \cfrac1{1 + \cfrac1{1 + \cfrac1{6 + \cfrac1{1 + \cfrac1{1 + \cfrac1{8 + {{} \atop \ddots}}}}}}} }}}}}
\end{align}$$

Here are some infinite generalized continued fraction expansions of e. The second is generated from the first by a simple equivalence transformation.

$$e= 2+\cfrac{1}{1+\cfrac{1}{2+\cfrac{2}{3+\cfrac{3}{4+\cfrac{4}{5+{{}\atop\ddots}}}}}} = 2+\cfrac{2}{2+\cfrac{3}{3+\cfrac{4}{4+\cfrac{5}{5+\cfrac{6}{6+{{}\atop\ddots}\,}}}}}$$

$$e = 2+\cfrac{1}{1+\cfrac{2}{5+\cfrac{1}{10+\cfrac{1}{14+\cfrac{1}{18+{{}\atop\ddots}\,}}}}} = 1+\cfrac{2}{1+\cfrac{1}{6+\cfrac{1}{10+\cfrac{1}{14+\cfrac{1}{18+{{}\atop\ddots}\,}}}}}$$

This last non-simple continued fraction (sequence A110185 in the OEIS), equivalent to $e = [1; 0.5, 12, 5, 28, 9, ...]$, has a quicker convergence rate compared to Euler's continued fraction formula and is a special case of a general formula for the exponential function:

$$e^{x/y} = 1+\cfrac{2x} {2y-x+\cfrac{x^2} {6y+\cfrac{x^2} {10y+\cfrac{x^2} {14y+\cfrac{x^2} {18y+{{}\atop\ddots}}}}}}$$

== As an infinite series ==
The number e can be expressed as the sum of the following infinite series:

$e^x = \sum_{k=0}^\infty \frac{x^k}{k!}$ for any real number x.

In the special case where x = 1 or -1, we have:

$e = \sum_{k=0}^\infty \frac{1}{k!}$, and

$$e^{-1} = \sum_{k=0}^\infty \frac{(-1)^k}{k!}.$$

Other series include the following:

$e = \left [ \sum_{k=0}^\infty \frac{1-2k}{(2k)!} \right ]^{-1}$

$$e =  \frac{1}{2} \sum_{k=0}^\infty \frac{k+1}{k!}$$

$$e =  2 \sum_{k=0}^\infty \frac{k+1}{(2k+1)!}$$

$$e =   \sum_{k=0}^\infty \frac{3-4k^2}{(2k+1)!}$$

$$e =   \sum_{k=0}^\infty \frac{(3k)^2+1}{(3k)!} = \sum_{k=0}^\infty \frac{(3k+1)^2+1}{(3k+1)!} = \sum_{k=0}^\infty \frac{(3k+2)^2+1}{(3k+2)!}$$

$$e =   \left [ \sum_{k=0}^\infty \frac{4k+3}{2^{2k+1}\,(2k+1)!} \right ]^2$$

$e = \sum_{k=0}^\infty \frac{k^n}{B_n(k!)}$ where $B_n$ is the nth Bell number.

$e^{-1} = \sum_{k=0}^\infty \frac{(-1)^k B_{2k}(2\pi)^{2k}}{(2k+1)!}$ where $B_{n}$ is the nth Bell number.

$e = \sum_{k=0}^\infty \frac{2k+3}{(k+2)!}$

Consideration of how to put upper bounds on e leads to this descending series:

$$e = 3 - \sum_{k=2}^\infty \frac{1}{k! (k-1) k} = 3 - \frac{1}{4} - \frac{1}{36} - \frac{1}{288} - \frac{1}{2400} - \frac{1}{21600} - \frac{1}{211680} - \frac{1}{2257920} - \cdots$$

which gives at least one correct (or rounded up) digit per term. That is, if 1 ≤ n, then

$$e < 3 - \sum_{k=2}^n \frac{1}{k! (k-1) k} < e + 0.6 \cdot 10^{1-n} \,.$$

More generally, if x is not in {2, 3, 4, 5, ...}, then

$$e^x = \frac{2+x}{2-x} + \sum_{k=2}^\infty \frac{- x^{k+1}}{k! (k-x) (k+1-x)} \,.$$

== As a recursive function ==
The series representation of $e$, given as
$$e = \frac{1}{0!} + \frac{1}{1!} + \frac{1}{2!} + \frac{1}{3!} + \cdots$$
can also be expressed using a form of recursion. When $\textstyle \frac{1}{n}$ is iteratively factored from the original series the result is the nested series
$$e = 1 + \frac{1}{1}\left(1 + \frac{1}{2}\left(1 + \frac{1}{3}\left(1 + \cdots \right)\right)\right)$$
which equates to
$$e = 1 + \cfrac{1 + \cfrac{1 + \cfrac{1 + \cdots }{3}}{2}}{1}$$
This fraction is of the form $\textstyle f(n) = 1 + \frac{f(n + 1)}{n}$, where $f(1)$ computes the sum of the terms from $1$ to $\infty$.

== As an infinite product ==
The number e is also given by several infinite product forms including Pippenger's product

$$e= 2 \left ( \frac{2}{1} \right )^{1/2} \left ( \frac{2}{3}\; \frac{4}{3} \right )^{1/4} \left ( \frac{4}{5}\; \frac{6}{5}\; \frac{6}{7}\; \frac{8}{7} \right )^{1/8} \cdots$$

and Guillera's product

$$e = \left ( \frac{2}{1} \right )^{1/1} \left (\frac{2^2}{1 \cdot 3} \right )^{1/2} \left (\frac{2^3 \cdot 4}{1 \cdot 3^3} \right )^{1/3}
\left (\frac{2^4 \cdot 4^4}{1 \cdot 3^6 \cdot 5} \right )^{1/4}  \cdots ,$$

where the nth factor is the nth root of the product

$$\prod_{k=0}^n (k+1)^{(-1)^{k+1}{n \choose k}},$$

as well as the infinite product

$$e = \frac{2\cdot 2^{(\ln(2)-1)^2} \cdots}{2^{\ln(2)-1}\cdot 2^{(\ln(2)-1)^3}\cdots }.$$

More generally, if 1 < B < e^{2} (which includes B = 2, 3, 4, 5, 6, or 7), then

$$e = \frac{B\cdot B^{(\ln(B)-1)^2} \cdots}{B^{\ln(B)-1}\cdot B^{(\ln(B)-1)^3}\cdots }.$$

Also

$$e = \lim\limits_{n\rightarrow\infty}\prod_{k=0}^n{n \choose k}^{2/{((n
+\alpha)(n+\beta))}}\ \forall\alpha,\beta\in\Bbb R$$

Additionally,

$$e^{-1} = 1^{1/1} 2^{-1/2} 3^{-1/3} 5^{-1/5} 6^{1/6} 7^{-1/7} 10^{1/10} 11^{-1/11} 13^{-1/13} 14^{1/14}\cdots,$$

where the exponent of each squarefree number $n$ is $\frac{\mu(n)}{n}$, where $\mu$ is the Möbius function.

== As the limit of a sequence ==
The number e is equal to the limit of several infinite sequences:

$e= \lim_{n \to \infty} n\cdot\left ( \frac{\sqrt{2 \pi n}}{n!} \right )^{1/n}$ and

$e=\lim_{n \to \infty} \frac{n}{\sqrt[n]{n!}}$ (both by Stirling's formula).

The symmetric limit,

$$e=\lim_{n \to \infty} \left [ \frac{(n+1)^{n+1}}{n^n}- \frac{n^n}{(n-1)^{n-1}} \right ]$$

may be obtained by manipulation of the basic limit definition of e.

The next two definitions are direct corollaries of the prime number theorem

$$\begin{align}
e &= \lim_{n \to \infty}(p_n \#)^{1/p_n} \\
e &= \lim_{n \to \infty} n^{\pi(n)/n} \\
&= \lim_{n \to \infty} n^{n/p_n}
\end{align}$$

where $p_n$ is the nth prime, $p_n \#$ is the primorial of the nth prime, and $\pi(n)$ is the prime-counting function.

Also:

$$e^x= \lim_{n \to \infty}\left (1+ \frac{x}{n} \right )^n.$$

In the special case that x = 1, the result is the famous statement:

$$e= \lim_{n \to \infty}\left (1+ \frac{1}{n} \right )^n.$$

The ratio of the factorial n!, that counts all permutations of an ordered set S with cardinality n, and the subfactorial (a.k.a. the derangement function) !n, which counts the amount of permutations where no element appears in its original position, tends to e as n grows.

$$e= \lim_{n \to \infty} \frac{n!}{!n}.$$

== As a limiting probability ==
If we consider an event which has a probability of $\frac{1}{n}$ of occurring in any one trial, then the probability of the event not occurring in n trials tends to 1/e. That is, $\lim_{n \to \infty}\left (1 - \frac{1}{n} \right )^n = \frac{1}{e}$

== As a binomial series ==
Consider the sequence:

$$e_n = \left(1 + \frac{1}{n}\right)^n$$

By the binomial theorem:

$$e_n = \sum_{k=0}^n {n \choose k} \frac{1}{n^k} = \sum_{k=0}^{n} \frac{n^{\underline{k}}}{k!} \frac{1}{n^k}$$

which converges to $e$ as $n$ increases. The term $n^{\underline{k}}$ is the $k$th falling factorial power of $n$, which behaves like $n^k$ when $n$ is large. For fixed $k$ and as $\textstyle n \to \infty$:

$$\frac{n^{\underline{k}}}{n^k} \approx 1 - \frac{k(k - 1)}{2n}$$

== As a ratio of ratios ==
A unique representation of e can be found within the structure of Pascal's triangle, as discovered by Harlan Brothers. Pascal's triangle is composed of binomial coefficients, which are traditionally summed to derive polynomial expansions. However, Brothers identified a product-based relationship between these coefficients that links to e. Specifically, the ratio of the products of binomial coefficients in adjacent rows of Pascal's triangle tends to e as the row number n increases:

$$\begin{align}
P_b(n) &= \sum_{k = 0}^{n} \log_b \binom{n}{k} \\
A &= P_b(n - 1), B = P_b(n), C = P_b(n + 1) \\
x &= (A - B) + (C - B) \sim \frac{1}{\ln b} \\
\end{align}$$

For $b = e, \exp x \sim e$.

The details of this relationship and its proof are outlined in the discussion on the properties of the rows of Pascal's triangle.

== In trigonometry ==
Trigonometrically, e can be written in terms of the sum of two hyperbolic functions,

$$e^x = \sinh(x) + \cosh(x) ,$$

at x = 1.

== See also ==
- List of formulae involving π
