= Hermite's problem =

Hermite's problem is an open problem in mathematics posed by Charles Hermite in 1848. He asked for a way of expressing real numbers as sequences of natural numbers, such that the sequence is eventually periodic precisely when the original number is a cubic irrational.

== Motivation ==
A standard way of writing real numbers is by their decimal representation, such as:
$$x=a_0.a_1a_2a_3\ldots\$$
where a_{0} is an integer, the integer part of x, and a_{1}, a_{2}, a_{3}, ... are integers between 0 and 9. Given this representation the number x is equal to
$$x=\sum_{n=0}^\infty \frac{a_n}{10^n}.$$

The real number x is a rational number only if its decimal expansion is eventually periodic, that is if there are natural numbers N and p such that for every n ≥ N it is the case that a_{n+p} = a_{n}.

Another way of expressing numbers is to write them as simple continued fractions, as in:
$$x=[a_0;a_1,a_2,a_3,\ldots],\$$
where a_{0} is an integer and a_{1}, a_{2}, a_{3}... are natural numbers. From this representation we can recover x since
$$x=a_0 + \cfrac{1}{a_1 + \cfrac{1}{a_2 + \cfrac{1}{a_3 + \ddots}}}.$$

If x is a rational number then the sequence (a_{n}) terminates after finitely many terms. On the other hand, Euler proved that irrational numbers require an infinite sequence to express them as continued fractions. Moreover, this sequence is eventually periodic (again, so that there are natural numbers N and p such that for every n ≥ N we have a_{n+p} = a_{n}), if and only if x is a quadratic irrational.

== Hermite's question ==
Rational numbers are algebraic numbers that satisfy a polynomial of degree 1, while quadratic irrationals are algebraic numbers that satisfy a polynomial of degree 2. For both these sets of numbers we have a way to construct a sequence of natural numbers (a_{n}) with the property that each sequence gives a unique real number and such that this real number belongs to the corresponding set if and only if the sequence is eventually periodic.

In 1848, Charles Hermite wrote a letter to Carl Gustav Jacob Jacobi asking if this situation could be generalised, that is can one assign a sequence of natural numbers to each real number x such that the sequence is eventually periodic precisely when x is a cubic irrational, that is an algebraic number of degree 3? Or, more generally, for each natural number d is there a way of assigning a sequence of natural numbers to each real number x that can pick out when x is algebraic of degree d?

== Approaches ==
Sequences that attempt to solve Hermite's problem are often called multidimensional continued fractions. Jacobi himself came up with an early example, finding a sequence corresponding to each pair of real numbers (x, y) that acted as a higher-dimensional analogue of continued fractions. He hoped to show that the sequence attached to (x, y) was eventually periodic if and only if both x and y belonged to a cubic number field, but was unable to do so and whether this is the case remains unsolved.

In 2015, for the first time, a periodic representation for any cubic irrational has been provided by means of ternary continued fractions, i.e., the problem of writing cubic irrationals as a periodic sequence of rational or integer numbers has been solved. However, the periodic representation does not derive from an algorithm defined over all real numbers and it is derived only starting from the knowledge of the minimal polynomial of the cubic irrational.

Rather than generalising continued fractions, another approach to the problem is to generalise Minkowski's question-mark function. This function ? : [0, 1] → [0, 1] also picks out quadratic irrational numbers since ?(x) is rational if and only if x is either rational or a quadratic irrational number, and moreover x is rational if and only if ?(x) is a dyadic rational, thus x is a quadratic irrational precisely when ?(x) is a non-dyadic rational number. Various generalisations of this function to either the unit square [0, 1] × [0, 1] or the two-dimensional simplex have been made, though none has yet solved Hermite's problem.

Two subtractive algorithms for finding a periodic representative of cubic vectors were proposed by Oleg Karpenkov. The first ($\sin^2$ algorithm) works for the totally real case only. The input for the algorithm is a triples of cubic vectors. A cubic vector is any vector generating a degree 3 extension of $\mathbb{Q}$. In this case the cubic vectors are conjugate if and only if the output of the algorithm is periodic. The second (HAPD algorithm) is conjectured to work for all cases (including for complex cubic vectors) and all dimensions $d\geq3$.

== See also ==
- Jacobi–Perron algorithm
