= Periodic continued fraction =

Simple continued fraction whose partial denominators repeat periodically

In mathematics, an infinite periodic continued fraction is a simple continued fraction that can be placed in the form

$$x = a_0 + \cfrac{1}{a_1 + \cfrac{1}{a_2 + \cfrac{1}{\quad\ddots\quad a_k + \cfrac{1}{a_{k+1} + \cfrac{1}{\quad\ddots\quad a_{k+m-1} + \cfrac{1}{a_{k+m} + \cfrac{1}{a_{k+1} + \cfrac{1}{a_{k+2} + {\ddots}}}}}}}}}$$

where the initial block $[a_0; a_1, \dots, a_k]$ of k+1 partial denominators is followed by a block $[a_{k+1}, a_{k+2}, \dots, a_{k+m}]$ of m partial denominators that repeats ad infinitum. For example, $\sqrt2$ can be expanded to the periodic continued fraction $[1; 2, 2, 2, ...]$.

This article considers only the case of periodic regular continued fractions. In other words, the remainder of this article assumes that all the partial denominators a_{i} (i ≥ 1) are positive integers. The general case, where the partial denominators a_{i} are arbitrary real or complex numbers, is treated in the article convergence problem.

== Purely periodic and periodic fractions ==
Since all the partial numerators in a regular continued fraction are equal to unity we can adopt a shorthand notation in which the continued fraction shown above is written as

$$\begin{align}
x& = [a_0;a_1,a_2,\dots,a_k,a_{k+1},a_{k+2},\dots,a_{k+m},a_{k+1},a_{k+2},\dots,a_{k+m},\dots]\\
& = [a_0;a_1,a_2,\dots,a_k,\overline{a_{k+1},a_{k+2},\dots,a_{k+m}}]
\end{align}$$

where, in the second line, a vinculum marks the repeating block. Some textbooks use the notation

$$\begin{align}
x& = [a_0;a_1,a_2,\dots,a_k,\dot a_{k+1},a_{k+2},\dots,\dot a_{k+m}]
\end{align}$$

where the repeating block is indicated by dots over its first and last terms.

If the initial non-repeating block is not present – that is, if k = -1, a_{0} = a_{m} and

$$x = [\overline{a_0;a_1,a_2,\dots,a_{m-1}}],$$

the regular continued fraction x is said to be purely periodic. For example, the regular continued fraction $[1; 1, 1, 1, \dots]$ of the golden ratio φ is purely periodic, while the regular continued fraction $[1; 2, 2, 2, \dots]$ of $\sqrt2$ is periodic, but not purely periodic. However, the regular continued fraction $[2; 2, 2, 2, \dots]$ of the silver ratio $\sigma = \sqrt2 + 1$ is purely periodic.

== As unimodular matrices ==
Periodic continued fractions are in one-to-one correspondence with the real quadratic irrationals. The correspondence is explicitly provided by Minkowski's question-mark function. That article also reviews tools that make it easy to work with such continued fractions. Consider first the purely periodic part

$$x = [0;\overline{a_1,a_2,\dots,a_m}],$$

This can, in fact, be written as

$$x = \frac{\alpha x+\beta}{\gamma x+\delta}$$

with the $\alpha,\beta,\gamma,\delta$ being integers, and satisfying $\alpha \delta-\beta \gamma=1.$ Explicit values can be obtained by writing

$$S = \begin{pmatrix} 1 & 0\\ 1 & 1\end{pmatrix}$$

which is termed a "shift", so that

$$S^n = \begin{pmatrix} 1 & 0\\ n & 1\end{pmatrix}$$

and similarly a reflection, given by

$$T\mapsto \begin{pmatrix} -1 & 1\\ 0 & 1\end{pmatrix}$$

so that $T^2=I$. Both of these matrices are unimodular, arbitrary products remain unimodular. Then, given $x$ as above, the corresponding matrix is of the form

$$S^{a_1}TS^{a_2}T\cdots TS^{a_m} = \begin{pmatrix} \alpha & \beta\\ \gamma & \delta\end{pmatrix}$$

and one has

$$x = [0;\overline{a_1,a_2,\dots,a_m}] = \frac{\alpha x+\beta}{\gamma x+\delta}$$

as the explicit form. As all of the matrix entries are integers, this matrix belongs to the modular group $SL(2,\mathbb{Z}).$

== Relation to quadratic irrationals ==
A quadratic irrational number is an irrational real root of the quadratic equation

$$ax^2 + bx + c = 0$$

where the coefficients a, b, and c are integers, and the discriminant, $b^2 - 4ac$, is greater than zero. By the quadratic formula, every quadratic irrational can be written in the form

$$\zeta = \frac{P+\sqrt{D}}{Q}$$

where P, D, and Q are integers, D > 0 is not a perfect square (but not necessarily square-free), and Q divides the quantity $P^2 - D$ (for example $(6 + \sqrt{8})/4$). Such a quadratic irrational may also be written in another form with a square-root of a square-free number (for example $(3 + \sqrt{2})/2$) as explained for quadratic irrationals.

By considering the complete quotients of periodic continued fractions, Euler was able to prove that if x is a regular periodic continued fraction, then x is a quadratic irrational number. The proof is straightforward. From the fraction itself, one can construct the quadratic equation with integral coefficients that x must satisfy.

Lagrange proved the converse of Euler's theorem: if x is a quadratic irrational, then the regular continued fraction expansion of x is periodic. Given a quadratic irrational x one can construct m different quadratic equations, each with the same discriminant, that relate the successive complete quotients of the regular continued fraction expansion of x to one another. Since there are only finitely many of these equations (the coefficients are bounded), the complete quotients (and also the partial denominators) in the regular continued fraction that represents x must eventually repeat.

== Reduced surds ==
The quadratic surd $\zeta = \frac{P + \sqrt{D}}{Q}$ is said to be reduced if $\zeta > 1$ and its conjugate $\eta = \frac{P - \sqrt{D}}{Q}$ satisfies the inequalities $-1 < \eta < 0$. For instance, the golden ratio $\phi = (1 + \sqrt{5})/2 = 1.618033...$ is a reduced surd because it is greater than one and its conjugate $(1 - \sqrt{5})/2 = -0.618033...$ is greater than −1 and less than zero. On the other hand, the square root of two $\sqrt{2} = (0 + \sqrt{8})/2$ is greater than one but is not a reduced surd because its conjugate $-\sqrt{2} = (0 - \sqrt{8})/2$ is less than −1.

Galois proved that the regular continued fraction which represents a quadratic surd ζ is purely periodic if and only if ζ is a reduced surd. In fact, Galois showed more than this. He also proved that if ζ is a reduced quadratic surd and η is its conjugate, then the continued fractions for ζ and for (−1/η) are both purely periodic, and the repeating block in one of those continued fractions is the mirror image of the repeating block in the other. In symbols we have

$$\begin{align}
\zeta& = [\overline{a_0;a_1,a_2,\dots,a_{m-1}}]\\[3pt]
\frac{-1}{\eta}& = [\overline{a_{m-1};a_{m-2},a_{m-3},\dots,a_0}]\,
\end{align}$$

where ζ is any reduced quadratic surd, and η is its conjugate.

From these two theorems of Galois a result already known to Lagrange can be deduced. If r > 1 is a rational number that is not a perfect square, then

$$\sqrt{r} = [a_0;\overline{a_1,a_2,\dots,a_2,a_1,2a_0}].$$

In particular, if n is any non-square positive integer, the regular continued fraction expansion of √n contains a repeating block of length m, in which the first m − 1 partial denominators form a palindromic string.

== Length of the repeating block ==
By analyzing the sequence of combinations

$$\frac{P_n + \sqrt{D}}{Q_n}$$

that can possibly arise when $\zeta = \frac{P + \sqrt{D}}{Q}$ is expanded as a regular continued fraction, Lagrange showed that the largest partial denominator a_{i} in the expansion is less than $2\sqrt{D}$, and that the length of the repeating block is less than 2D.

More recently, sharper arguments based on the divisor function have shown that the length of the repeating block for a quadratic surd of discriminant D is on the order of $\mathcal{O}(\sqrt{D}\ln{D}).$

=== Canonical form and repetend ===
The following iterative algorithm can be used to obtain the continued fraction expansion in canonical form (S is any natural number that is not a perfect square):

$$m_0=0\,\!$$

$$d_0=1\,\!$$

$$a_0=\left\lfloor\sqrt{S}\right\rfloor\,\!$$

$$m_{n+1}=d_na_n-m_n\,\!$$

$$d_{n+1}=\frac{S-m_{n+1}^2}{d_n}\,\!$$

$$a_{n+1} =\left\lfloor\frac{\sqrt{S}+m_{n+1}}{d_{n+1}}\right\rfloor =\left\lfloor\frac{a_0+m_{n+1}}{d_{n+1}}\right\rfloor\!.$$

Notice that m_{n}, d_{n}, and a_{n} are always integers. The algorithm terminates when this triplet is the same as one encountered before. The algorithm can also terminate on a_{i} when a_{i} = 2 a_{0}, which is easier to implement.

The expansion will repeat from then on. The sequence $[a_0; a_1, a_2, a_3, \dots]$ is the continued fraction expansion:

$$\sqrt{S} = a_0 + \cfrac{1}{a_1 + \cfrac{1}{a_2 + \cfrac{1}{a_3+\,\ddots}}}$$

==== Example ====
To obtain √114 as a continued fraction, begin with m_{0} = 0; d_{0} = 1; and a_{0} = 10 (10^{2} = 100 and 11^{2} = 121 > 114 so 10 chosen).

$$\begin{align}
\sqrt{114} & = \frac{\sqrt{114}+0}{1} = 10+\frac{\sqrt{114}-10}{1} = 10+\frac{(\sqrt{114}-10)(\sqrt{114}+10)}{\sqrt{114}+10} \\
& = 10+\frac{114-100}{\sqrt{114}+10} = 10+\frac{1}{\frac{\sqrt{114}+10}{14}}.
\end{align}$$

$$m_{1} = d_{0} \cdot a_{0} - m_{0} = 1 \cdot 10 - 0 = 10 \,.$$

$$d_{1} = \frac{S-m_{1}^2}{d_0} = \frac{114-10^2}{1} = 14 \,.$$

$$a_{1} = \left\lfloor \frac{a_0+m_{1}}{d_{1}} \right\rfloor = \left\lfloor \frac{10+10}{14} \right\rfloor = \left\lfloor \frac{20}{14} \right\rfloor = 1 \,.$$

So, m_{1} = 10; d_{1} = 14; and a_{1} = 1.

$$\frac{\sqrt{114}+10}{14} = 1+\frac{\sqrt{114}-4}{14} = 1+\frac{114-16}{14(\sqrt{114}+4)} = 1+\frac{1}{\frac{\sqrt{114}+4}{7}}.$$

Next, m_{2} = 4; d_{2} = 7; and a_{2} = 2.

$$\frac{\sqrt{114}+4}{7} = 2+\frac{\sqrt{114}-10}{7} = 2+\frac{14}{7(\sqrt{114}+10)} = 2+\frac{1}{\frac{\sqrt{114}+10}{2}}.$$

$$\frac{\sqrt{114}+10}{2}=10+\frac{\sqrt{114}-10}{2}=10+\frac{14}{2(\sqrt{114}+10)} = 10+\frac{1}{\frac{\sqrt{114}+10}{7}}.$$

$$\frac{\sqrt{114}+10}{7}=2+\frac{\sqrt{114}-4}{7}=2+\frac{98}{7(\sqrt{114}+4)} = 2+\frac{1}{\frac{\sqrt{114}+4}{14}}.$$

$$\frac{\sqrt{114}+4}{14}=1+\frac{\sqrt{114}-10}{14}=1+\frac{14}{14(\sqrt{114}+10)} = 1+\frac{1}{\frac{\sqrt{114}+10}{1}}.$$

$$\frac{\sqrt{114}+10}{1}=20+\frac{\sqrt{114}-10}{1}=20+\frac{14}{\sqrt{114}+10} = 20+\frac{1}{\frac{\sqrt{114}+10}{14}}.$$

Now, loop back to the second equation above.

Consequently, the simple continued fraction for the square root of 114 is

$\sqrt{114} = [10;\overline{1,2,10,2,1,20}].\,$ (sequence A010179 in the OEIS)

√114 is approximately 10.67707 82520. After one expansion of the repetend, the continued fraction yields the rational fraction $\frac{21194}{1985}$ whose decimal value is approx. 10.67707 80856, a relative error of 0.0000016% or 1.6 parts in 100,000,000.

==== Implementation in Python ====
See here.

==== Generalized continued fraction ====
A more rapid method is to evaluate its generalized continued fraction. From the formula derived there:

$$\begin{align}
\sqrt{z} = \sqrt{x^2+y} &= x+\cfrac{y} {2x+\cfrac{y} {2x+\cfrac{y} {2x+\ddots}}}  \\
&= x+\cfrac{2x \cdot y}{2(2z-y)-y-\cfrac{y^2} {2(2z-y)-\cfrac{y^2} {2(2z-y)-\ddots}}}
\end{align}$$

and the fact that 114 is 2/3 of the way between 10^{2}=100 and 11^{2}=121 results in

$$\begin{align}
\sqrt{114} = \cfrac{\sqrt{1026}}{3} = \cfrac{\sqrt{32^2+2}}{3} &= \cfrac{32}{3}+\cfrac{2/3} {64+\cfrac{2} {64+\cfrac{2} {64+\cfrac{2} {64+\ddots}}}} \\
&= \cfrac{32}{3}+\cfrac{2} {192+\cfrac{18} {192+\cfrac{18} {192+\ddots}}},
\end{align}$$

which is simply the aforementioned $[10;1,2, \, 10,2,1, \, 20,1,2]$ evaluated at every third term. Combining pairs of fractions produces

$$\begin{align}
\sqrt{114} = \cfrac{\sqrt{32^2+2}}{3} &= \cfrac{32}{3}+\cfrac{64/3} {2050-1-\cfrac{1} {2050-\cfrac{1} {2050-\ddots}}} \\
&= \cfrac{32}{3}+\cfrac{64}{6150-3-\cfrac{9} {6150-\cfrac{9} {6150-\ddots}}},
\end{align}$$

which is now $[10;1,2, \overline{10,2,1,20,1,2}]$ evaluated at the third term and every six terms thereafter.

== See also ==
- Continued fraction – Mathematical expression
- Generalized continued fraction – Mathematical expression
- Hermite's problem
- Continued fraction method of computing square roots – Algorithms for calculating square roots
- Restricted partial quotients – Analytic series
- Continued fraction factorization
