= Apotome =

Apotome may refer to:

- Apotome (mathematics) a mathematical term used by Euclid.
- Apotome (music)
- Apotome (optics) used for increasing axial resolution of fluorescence microscopy of thick specimens by structured illumination.
