= Proof that e is irrational =

The number e was introduced by Jacob Bernoulli in 1683. More than half a century later, Euler, who had been a student of Jacob's younger brother Johann, proved that e is irrational; that is, that it cannot be expressed as the quotient of two integers.

== Euler's proof ==
Euler wrote the first proof of the fact that e is irrational in 1737 (but the text was only published seven years later). He computed the representation of e as a simple continued fraction, which is

$$e = [2; 1, 2, 1, 1, 4, 1, 1, 6, 1, 1, 8, 1, 1, \ldots, 2n, 1, 1, \ldots].$$

Since this continued fraction is infinite and every rational number has a terminating continued fraction, e is irrational. A short proof of the previous equality is known. Since the simple continued fraction of e is not periodic, this also proves that e is not a root of a quadratic polynomial with rational coefficients; in particular, e^{2} is irrational.

== Fourier's proof ==
The most well-known proof is Joseph Fourier's proof by contradiction, which is based upon the equality

$$e = \sum_{n = 0}^\infty \frac{1}{n!}.$$

Initially e is assumed to be a rational number of the form a/b. The idea is to then analyze the scaled-up difference (here denoted x) between the series representation of e and its strictly smaller b-th partial sum, which approximates the limiting value e. By choosing the scale factor to be the factorial of b, the fraction a/b and the b-th partial sum are turned into integers, hence x must be a positive integer. However, the fast convergence of the series representation implies that x is still strictly smaller than 1. From this contradiction we deduce that e is irrational.

The detailed proof goes as follows:

If e is a rational number, there exist positive integers a and b such that e = a/b. Define the number

$$x = b!\left(e - \sum_{n = 0}^{b} \frac{1}{n!}\right).$$

Use the assumption that e = a/b to obtain

$$x = b!\left (\frac{a}{b} - \sum_{n = 0}^{b} \frac{1}{n!}\right) = a(b - 1)! - \sum_{n = 0}^{b} \frac{b!}{n!}.$$

The first term is an integer, and every fraction in the sum is actually an integer because n ≤ b for each term. Therefore, under the assumption that e is rational, x is an integer.

We now prove that 0 < x < 1. First, to prove that x is strictly positive, we insert the above series representation of e into the definition of x and obtain

$$x = b!\left(\sum_{n = 0}^{\infty} \frac{1}{n!} - \sum_{n = 0}^{b} \frac{1}{n!}\right) = \sum_{n = b+1}^{\infty} \frac{b!}{n!}>0,$$

because all the terms are strictly positive.

We now prove that x < 1. For all terms with n ≥ b + 1 we have the upper estimate

$$\frac{b!}{n!} =\frac1{(b + 1)(b + 2) \cdots \big(b + (n - b)\big)} \le \frac1{(b + 1)^{n-b}}.$$

This inequality is strict for every n ≥ b + 2. Changing the index of summation to k = n – b and using the formula for the infinite geometric series, we obtain

$$x =\sum_{n = b + 1}^\infty \frac{b!}{n!}
< \sum_{n=b+1}^\infty \frac1{(b + 1)^{n-b}}
=\sum_{k=1}^\infty \frac1{(b + 1)^k}
=\frac{1}{b+1} \left (\frac1{1 - \frac1{b + 1}}\right)
= \frac{1}{b} \le 1.$$

And therefore $x<1.$

Since there is no integer strictly between 0 and 1, we have reached a contradiction, and so e is irrational, Q.E.D.

== Alternative proofs ==
Another proof can be obtained from the previous one by noting that

$$(b + 1)x =
1 + \frac1{b + 2} + \frac1{(b + 2)(b + 3)} + \cdots <
1 + \frac1{b + 1} + \frac1{(b + 1)(b + 2)} + \cdots =
1 + x,$$

and this inequality is equivalent to the assertion that bx < 1. This is impossible, of course, since b and x are positive integers.

Still another proof can be obtained from the fact that

$$\frac{1}{e} = e^{-1} = \sum_{n=0}^\infty \frac{(-1)^n}{n!}.$$

Define $s_n$ as follows:

$$s_n = \sum_{k=0}^n \frac{(-1)^{k}}{k!}.$$

Then

$$e^{-1} - s_{2n-1} = \sum_{k=0}^\infty \frac{(-1)^{k}}{k!} - \sum_{k=0}^{2n-1} \frac{(-1)^{k}}{k!} < \frac{1}{(2n)!},$$

which implies

$$0 < (2n - 1)! \left(e^{-1} - s_{2n-1}\right) < \frac{1}{2n} \le \frac{1}{2}$$

for any positive integer $n$.

Note that $(2n - 1)!s_{2n-1}$ is always an integer. Assume that $e^{-1}$ is rational, so $e^{-1} = p/q,$ where $p, q$ are co-prime, and $q \neq 0.$ It is possible to appropriately choose $n$ so that $(2n - 1)!e^{-1}$ is an integer, i.e. $n \geq (q + 1)/2.$ Hence, for this choice, the difference between $(2n - 1)!e^{-1}$ and $(2n - 1)!s_{2n-1}$ would be an integer. But from the above inequality, that is not possible. So, $e^{-1}$ is irrational. This means that $e$ is irrational.

== Generalizations ==
In 1840, Liouville published a proof of the fact that e^{2} is irrational followed by a proof that e^{2} is not a root of a second-degree polynomial with rational coefficients. This last fact implies that e^{4} is irrational. His proofs are similar to Fourier's proof of the irrationality of e. In 1891, Hurwitz explained how it is possible to prove along the same line of ideas that e is not a root of a third-degree polynomial with rational coefficients, which implies that e^{3} is irrational. More generally, e^{q} is irrational for any non-zero rational q.

Charles Hermite further proved that e is a transcendental number, in 1873, which means that is not a root of any polynomial with rational coefficients, as is e^{α} for any non-zero algebraic α.

== See also ==
- Characterizations of the exponential function
- Transcendental number, including a proof that e is transcendental
- Lindemann–Weierstrass theorem
- Proof that π is irrational
