= Complete quotient =

In the metrical theory of regular continued fractions, the kth complete quotient ζ _{k} is obtained by ignoring the first k partial denominators a_{i}. For example, if a regular continued fraction is given by

$$x = [a_0; a_1, a_2, a_3, \dots] = a_0 + \cfrac{1}{a_1 + \cfrac{1}{a_2 + \cfrac{1}{a_3 + \cfrac{1}{\ddots}}}},$$

then the successive complete quotients ζ _{k} are given by

$$\begin{align}
\zeta_0 & = [a_0; a_1, a_2, a_3, \dots]\\
\zeta_1 & = [a_1; a_2, a_3, a_4, \dots]\\
\zeta_2 & = [a_2; a_3, a_4, a_5, \dots]\\
\zeta_k & = [a_k; a_{k+1}, a_{k+2}, a_{k+3}, \dots]. \,
\end{align}$$

== A recursive relationship ==
From the definition given above we can immediately deduce that

$$\zeta_k = a_k + \frac{1}{\zeta_{k+1}} = [a_k; \zeta_{k+1}], \,$$

or, equivalently,

$$\zeta_{k+1} = \frac{1}{\zeta_k - a_k}.\,$$

== Complete quotients and the convergents of x ==
Denoting the successive convergents of the regular continued fraction x = [a_{0}; a_{1}, a_{2}, …] by A_{0}, A_{1}/B_{1}, A_{2}/B_{2}, … (as explained more fully in the article fundamental recurrence formulas), it can be shown that

$$x = \frac{A_k \zeta_{k+1} + A_{k-1}}{B_k \zeta_{k+1} + B_{k-1}}\,$$

for all k ≥ 0.

This result can be better understood by recalling that the successive convergents of an infinite regular continued fraction approach the value x in a sort of zig-zag pattern:

$$A_0 < \frac{A_2}{B_2} < \frac{A_4}{B_4} < \cdots < \frac{A_{2n}}{B_{2n}} < x
< \frac{A_{2n+1}}{B_{2n+1}} < \cdots < \frac{A_5}{B_5} < \frac{A_3}{B_3} < \frac{A_1}{B_1}.\,$$

so that when k is even we have A_{k}/B_{k} < x < A_{k+1}/B_{k+1}, and when k is odd we have A_{k+1}/B_{k+1} < x < A_{k}/B_{k}. In either case, the k + 1st complete quotient ζ _{k+1} is the unique real number that expresses x in the form of a semiconvergent.

== Complete quotients and equivalent real numbers ==
=== An equivalence relation defined by linear fractional transformations ===
Consider the set of linear fractional transformations (LFTs) defined by

$$f(x) = \frac{a + bx}{c + dx}\,$$

where a, b, c, and d are integers, and ad − bc = ±1. Since this set of LFTs contains an identity element (0 + x)/1, and since it is closed under composition of functions, and every member of the set has an inverse in the set, these LFTs form a group (the group operation being composition of functions), GL(2,Z).

We can define an equivalence relation on the set of real numbers by means of this group of linear fractional transformations. We will say that two real numbers x and y are equivalent (written x ~ y) if

$$y = f(x) = \frac{a + bx}{c + dx}\,$$

for some integers a, b, c, and d such that ad − bc = ±1.

Clearly this relation is symmetric, reflexive, and transitive, so it is an equivalence relation and it can be used to separate the real numbers into equivalence classes. All the rational numbers are equivalent, because each rational number is equivalent to zero. What can be said about the irrational numbers? Do they also fall into a single equivalence class?

=== A theorem about "equivalent" irrational numbers ===
Two irrational numbers x and y are equivalent under this scheme if and only if the infinitely long "tails" in their expansions as regular continued fractions are exactly the same. More precisely, the following theorem can be proved.

Let x and y be two irrational (real) numbers, and let the kth complete quotient in the regular continued fraction expansions of x and y be denoted by ζ _{k} and ψ_{k}, respectively, Then x ~ y (under the equivalence defined in the preceding section) if and only if there are positive integers m and n such that ζ_{m} = ψ_{n}.

=== An example ===
The golden ratio φ is the irrational number with the very simplest possible expansion as a regular continued fraction: φ = [1; 1, 1, 1, …]. The theorem tells us first that if x is any real number whose expansion as a regular continued fraction contains the infinite string [1, 1, 1, 1, …], then there are integers a, b, c, and d (with ad − bc = ±1) such that

$$x = \frac{a + b\phi}{c + d\phi}.\,$$

Conversely, if a, b, c, and d are integers (with ad − bc = ±1), then the regular continued fraction expansion of every real number y that can be expressed in the form

$$y = \frac{a + b\phi}{c + d\phi}\,$$

eventually reaches a "tail" that looks just like the regular continued fraction for φ.
