= Charles Méray =

French mathematician

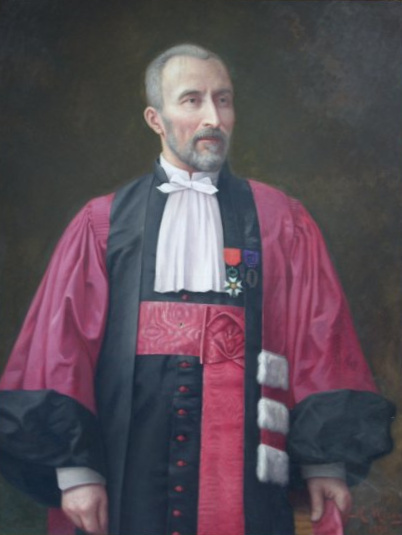
- Born: 12 November 1835; Chalon-sur-Saône, France
- Died: 2 February 1911 (aged 75); Dijon, France
- Scientific career
- Fields: Mathematics
- Thesis: Sur les propriétés générales des racines d'équations synectiques (1858)

Hugues Charles Robert Méray (12 November 1835, in Chalon-sur-Saône, Saône-et-Loire – 2 February 1911, in Dijon) was a French mathematician. He is noted as the first to publish an arithmetical theory of irrational numbers. His work did not have much of a role in the history of mathematics because France, at that time, was less interested in such matters than Germany.

He was an Invited Speaker of the ICM in 1900 in Paris; his contributed paper was presented by Charles-Ange Laisant.

Méray was also a speaker of Esperanto. From 1900 until his death, Méray campaigned for the introduction of Esperanto into the scientific world and presented his case to the French Academy of Sciences in 1901.
