= Restricted partial quotients =

Analytic series

In mathematics, and more particularly in the analytic theory of regular continued fractions, an infinite regular continued fraction x is said to be restricted, or composed of restricted partial quotients, if the sequence of denominators of its partial quotients is bounded; that is
$$x = [a_0;a_1,a_2,\dots] = a_0 + \cfrac{1}{a_1 + \cfrac{1}{a_2 + \cfrac{1}{a_3 + \cfrac{1}{a_4 + \ddots}}}} = a_0 + \underset{i=1}{\overset{\infty}{K}} \frac{1}{a_i},\,$$

and there is some positive integer M such that all the (integral) partial denominators a_{i} are less than or equal to M.

== Periodic continued fractions ==
A regular periodic continued fraction consists of a finite initial block of partial denominators followed by a repeating block; if
$$\zeta = [a_0;a_1,a_2,\dots,a_k,\overline{a_{k+1},a_{k+2},\dots,a_{k+m}}],\,$$
then ζ is a quadratic irrational number, and its representation as a regular continued fraction is periodic. Clearly any regular periodic continued fraction consists of restricted partial quotients, since none of the partial denominators can be greater than the largest of a_{0} through a_{k+m}. Historically, mathematicians studied periodic continued fractions before considering the more general concept of restricted partial quotients.

== Restricted CFs and the Cantor set ==
The Cantor set is a set C of measure zero from which a complete interval of real numbers can be constructed by simple addition – that is, any real number from the interval can be expressed as the sum of exactly two elements of the set C. The usual proof of the existence of the Cantor set is based on the idea of punching a "hole" in the middle of an interval, then punching holes in the remaining sub-intervals, and repeating this process ad infinitum.

The process of adding one more partial quotient to a finite continued fraction is in many ways analogous to this process of "punching a hole" in an interval of real numbers. The size of the "hole" is inversely proportional to the next partial denominator chosen – if the next partial denominator is 1, the gap between successive convergents is maximized. To make the following theorems precise we will consider CF(M), the set of restricted continued fractions whose values lie in the open interval (0, 1) and whose partial denominators are bounded by a positive integer M – that is,

$$\mathrm{CF}(M) = \{[0;a_1,a_2,a_3,\dots]: 1 \leq a_i \leq M \}.\,$$

By making an argument parallel to the one used to construct the Cantor set two interesting results can be obtained.

- If M ≥ 4, then any real number in an interval can be constructed as the sum of two elements from CF(M), where the interval is given by
  $$(2\times[0;\overline{M,1}], 2\times[0;\overline{1,M}]) =
\left(\frac{1}{M} \left[\sqrt{M^2 + 4M} - M \right], \sqrt{M^2 + 4M} - M \right).$$
- A simple argument shows that $[0;\overline{1,M}]-[0;\overline{M,1}]\ge\frac{1}{2}$ holds when M ≥ 4, and this in turn implies that if M ≥ 4, every real number can be represented in the form n + CF_{1} + CF_{2}, where n is an integer, and CF_{1} and CF_{2} are elements of CF(M).

== Zaremba's conjecture ==
Zaremba has conjectured the existence of an absolute constant A, such that the rationals with partial quotients restricted by A contain at least one for every (positive integer) denominator. The choice A = 5 is compatible with the numerical evidence. Further conjectures reduce that value, in the case of all sufficiently large denominators. Jean Bourgain and Alex Kontorovich have shown that A can be chosen so that the conclusion holds for a set of denominators of density 1.

== See also ==
- Markov spectrum
