= Jacobi–Perron algorithm =

In mathematics, the Jacobi–Perron algorithm is a generalization of the Euclidean algorithm to n-tuples of real numbers, which addresses Hermite's problem. It was defined by C. G. J. Jacobi for n = 2 and Oskar Perron for n ≥ 2.

== Sources ==
- Leon Bernstein: The Jacobi-Perron algorithm - its theory and application. Lecture Notes Math. 207, Springer-Verlag, 1971
