= Milü =

Pi approximations by astronomer Zu Chongzhi

- Chinese: 密率
- Literal meaning: close ratio
Transcriptions
Standard Mandarin
- Hanyu Pinyin: mìlǜ
- Wade–Giles: mi^{4} lü^{4}
Yue: Cantonese
- Yale Romanization: maht léut
- Jyutping: mat6 leot2

Fractional approximations of π

Milü (Chinese: 密率; pinyin: mìlǜ; lit. 'close ratio'), also known as Zulü (Zu's ratio), is the name given to an approximation of π (pi) found by the Chinese mathematician and astronomer Zu Chongzhi during the 5th century. Using Liu Hui's algorithm, which is based on the areas of regular polygons approximating a circle, Zu computed π as being between 3.1415926 and 3.1415927 (Note: Specifically, Zu found that if the diameter $d$ of a circle has a length of $100,000,000$, then the length of the circle's circumference $C$ falls within the range $314,159,260 < C < 314,159,270$. It is not known what method Zu used to calculate this result.) and gave two rational approximations of π, 22/7 and 355/113, which were named yuelü (约率; yuēlǜ; 'approximate ratio') and milü respectively.

355/113 is the best rational approximation of π with a denominator of four digits or fewer, being accurate to six decimal places. It is within 0.000009% of the value of π, or in terms of common fractions overestimates π by less than 1/3748629. The next rational number (ordered by size of denominator) that is a better rational approximation of π is 52163/16604, though it is still only correct to six decimal places. To be accurate to seven decimal places, one needs to go as far as 86953/27678. For eight, 102928/32763 is needed, and for nine, 103993/33102 is required.

The accuracy of milü to the true value of π can be explained using the continued fraction expansion of π, the first few terms of which are [3; 7, 15, 1, 292, 1, 1, ...] (sequence A001203 in the OEIS). A property of continued fractions is that truncating the expansion of a given number at any point will give the best rational approximation of the number. To obtain milü, truncate the continued fraction expansion of π immediately before the term 292; that is, π is approximated by the finite continued fraction [3; 7, 15, 1], which is equivalent to milü. Since 292 is an unusually large term in a continued fraction expansion (corresponding to the next truncation introducing only a very small term, 1/292, to the overall fraction), this convergent will be especially close to the true value of π:

$$\pi = 3 + \cfrac{1}{7 + \cfrac{1}{15 + \cfrac{1}{1 + {\color{magenta} \cfrac{1}{292 + \cdots}}}}} \quad\approx\quad 3 + \cfrac{1}{7 + \cfrac{1}{15 + \cfrac{1}{1 + {\color{magenta} 0}}}} = \frac{355}{113}$$

Zu's contemporary calendarist and mathematician He Chengtian invented a fraction interpolation method called 'harmonization of the divisor of the day' (调日法; diaorifa) to increase the accuracy of approximations of π by iteratively adding the numerators and denominators of fractions. Zu's approximation of π ≈ 355/113 can be obtained with He Chengtian's method.

== See also ==
- Continued fraction expansion of π and its convergents
- Approximations of π
- Pi Approximation Day
