= Gaussian brackets =

In mathematics, Gaussian brackets are a special notation invented by Carl Friedrich Gauss to represent the convergents of a simple continued fraction in the form of a simple fraction. Gauss used this notation in the context of finding solutions of the indeterminate equations of the form $ax=by\pm 1$.

This notation should not be confused with the widely prevalent use of square brackets to denote the greatest integer function: $[x]$ denotes the greatest integer less than or equal to $x$. This notation was also invented by Gauss and was used in the third proof of the quadratic reciprocity law. The notation $\lfloor x \rfloor$, denoting the floor function, is now more commonly used to denote the greatest integer less than or equal to $x$.

== The notation ==
The Gaussian brackets notation is defined as follows:

$$\begin{align}
\quad[\,\,] & = 1\\[1mm]
[a_1] & = a_1\\[1mm]
[a_1, a_2] & = [a_1]a_2 + [\,\,]\\[1mm]
& = a_1a_2+1\\[1mm]
[a_1, a_2, a_3] & = [a_1, a_2]a_3 + [a_1] \\[1mm]
& = a_1a_2a_3  + a_1 + a_3 \\[1mm]
[a_1,a_2,a_3,a_4] & = [a_1,a_2,a_3]a_4 + [a_1,a_2]\\[1mm]
& = a_1a_2a_3a_4 + a_1a_2 + a_1a_4 + a_3a_4 + 1\\[1mm]
[a_1,a_2,a_3,a_4,a_5] & = [a_1,a_2,a_3,a_4]a_5 + [a_1, a_2,a_3]\\[1mm]
& = a_1a_2a_3a_4a_5 + a_1a_2a_3 + a_1a_2a_5 + a_1a_4a_5 + a_3a_4a_5 + a_1+a_3+a_5\\[1mm]
\vdots & \\[1mm]
[a_1,a_2,\ldots,a_n] & = [a_1,a_2,\ldots,a_{n-1}]a_n + [a_1,a_2,\ldots,a_{n-2}]
\end{align}$$

The expanded form of the expression $[a_1,a_2,\ldots, a_n]$ can be described thus: "The first term is the product of all n members; after it come all possible products of (n -2) members in which the numbers have alternately odd and even indices in ascending order, each starting with an odd index; then all possible products of (n-4) members likewise have successively higher alternating odd and even indices, each starting with an odd index; and so on. If the bracket has an odd number of members, it ends with the sum of all members of odd index; if it has an even number, it ends with unity."

With this notation, one can easily verify that

$$\cfrac{1}{a_1  + \cfrac{1}{ a_2 + \cfrac{1}{a_3 + \cdots \frac{\ddots}{    \cfrac{1}{a_{n-1} +\frac{1}{a_n}} } }}} = \frac{[a_2,\ldots,a_n]}{[a_1,a_2,\ldots,a_n]}$$

== Properties ==
1. The bracket notation can also be defined by the recursion relation: $\,\,[a_1,a_2, a_3, \ldots, a_n]=a_1[a_2,a_3, \ldots,a_n] + [a_3,\ldots,a_n]$
2. The notation is symmetric or reversible in the arguments: $\,\,[a_1,a_2, \ldots,a_{n-1},a_n]=[a_n,a_{n-1},\ldots, a_2,a_1]$
3. The Gaussian brackets expression can be written by means of a determinant:
  $$\,\,[a_1,a_2,\ldots,a_n] =
\begin{vmatrix}
a_1 &  -1  & 0   & 0  & \cdots & 0 & 0 & 0 \\[1mm]
1   &  a_2 & -1  & 0  & \cdots & 0 & 0 & 0 \\[1mm]
0   &  1   & a_3 & -1 & \cdots & 0 & 0 & 0 \\[1mm]
\vdots &   &     &    &        &   &   &   \\[1mm]
0   &  0   & 0   & 0  & \cdots & 1 & a_{n-1} & -1 \\[1mm]
0   &  0   & 0   & 0  & \cdots & 0 &  1  & a_n
\end{vmatrix}$$
4. The notation satisfies the determinant formula (for $n=1$ use the convention that $[a_2,\ldots,a_0]=0$):
  $$\,\, \begin{vmatrix} [a_1,\ldots,a_n] & [a_1,\ldots,a_{n-1}]\\[1mm] [a_2, \ldots, a_{n}] &  [a_2,\ldots, a_{n-1}]\end{vmatrix}=(-1)^n$$
5. $[-a_1, -a_2, \ldots, -a_n] = (-1)^n[a_1,a_2, \ldots,a_n]$
6. Let the elements in the Gaussian bracket expression be alternatively 0. Then
  $$\begin{align}
\,\,\quad[a_1,0,a_3,0,\ldots,a_{2m+1}] & = a_1+a_3+\cdots + a_{2m+1}\\[1mm]
[a_1,0,a_3,0,\ldots,a_{2m+1}, 0] & = 1\\[1mm]
[0, a_2, 0, a_4, \ldots, a_{2m}] & = 1 \\[1mm]
[0, a_2, 0, a_4, \ldots, a_{2m}, 0] & = 0
\end{align}$$

== Applications ==
The Gaussian brackets have been used extensively by optical designers as a time-saving device in computing the effects of changes in surface power, thickness, and separation of focal length, magnification, and object and image distances.

== Additional reading ==
The following papers give additional details regarding the applications of Gaussian brackets in optics.

- Chen Ma, Dewen Cheng, Q. Wang and Chen Xu (November 2014). "Optical System Design of a Liquid Tunable Fundus Camera Based on Gaussian Brackets Method". Acta Optica Sinica. 34 (11). doi:10.3788/AOS201434.1122001.
- Yi Zhong, Herbert Gross (May 2017). "Initial system design method for non-rotationally symmetric systems based on Gaussian brackets and Nodal aberration theory". Opt Express. 25 (9): 10016–10030. Bibcode:2017OExpr..2510016Z. doi:10.1364/OE.25.010016. PMID 28468369.
- Xiangyu Yuan and Xuemin Cheng (November 2014). "Lens design based on lens form parameters using Gaussian brackets". In Wang, Yongtian; Du, Chunlei; Sasián, José; Tatsuno, Kimio (eds.). Optical Design and Testing VI. Vol. 9272. pp. 92721L. Bibcode:2014SPIE.9272E..1LY. doi:10.1117/12.2073422. S2CID 121201008.
