= Euler's continued fraction formula =

Mathematical identity

In the analytic theory of continued fractions, Euler's continued fraction formula is an identity connecting a certain very general infinite series with an infinite continued fraction. First published in 1748, it was at first regarded as a simple identity connecting a finite sum with a finite continued fraction in such a way that the extension to the infinite case was immediately apparent. Today it is more fully appreciated as a useful tool in analytic attacks on the general convergence problem for infinite continued fractions with complex elements.

== The original formula ==
Euler derived the formula as connecting a finite sum of products with a finite continued fraction.

$$\begin{align}
a_0\left(1 + a_1\left(1 + a_2\left(\cdots + a_n\right)\cdots\right)\right) & = a_0 + a_0a_1 + a_0a_1a_2 + \cdots + a_0a_1a_2\cdots a_n \\
& = \cfrac{a_0}{1 - \cfrac{a_1}{1 + a_1 - \cfrac{a_2}{1 + a_2 - \cfrac{\ddots}{\ddots
\cfrac{a_{n-1}}{1 + a_{n-1} - \cfrac{a_n}{1 + a_n}}}}}}\,
\end{align}$$

The identity is easily established by induction on n, and is therefore applicable in the limit: if the expression on the left is extended to represent a convergent infinite series, the expression on the right can also be extended to represent a convergent infinite continued fraction.

This is written more compactly using generalized continued fraction notation:

$$a_0 + a_0 a_1 + a_0 a_1 a_2 + \cdots + a_0 a_1 a_2 \cdots a_n =
\frac{a_0}{1 +} \, \frac{-a_1}{1 + a_1 +} \, \cfrac{-a_2}{1 + a_2 +} \cdots \frac{-a_n}{1 + a_n}.$$

== Euler's formula ==
If r_{i} are complex numbers and x is defined by

$$x = 1 + \sum_{i=1}^\infty r_1r_2\cdots r_i = 1 + \sum_{i=1}^\infty \left( \prod_{j=1}^i r_j \right)\,,$$

then this equality can be proved by induction

$$x = \cfrac{1}{1 - \cfrac{r_1}{1 + r_1 - \cfrac{r_2}{1 + r_2 - \cfrac{r_3}{1 + r_3 - \ddots}}}}\,$$.

Here equality is to be understood as equivalence, in the sense that the n'th convergent of each continued fraction is equal to the nth partial sum of the series shown above. So if the series shown is convergent – or uniformly convergent, when the r_{i}s are functions of some complex variable z – then the continued fractions also converge, or converge uniformly.

== Proof by induction ==
Theorem: Let $n$ be a natural number. For $n+1$ complex values $a_0, a_1, \ldots, a_{n}$,

$$\sum_{k=0}^n \prod_{j=0}^k a_j = \frac{a_0}{1+} \, \frac{-a_1}{1+a_1+} \cdots \frac{-a_n}{1+a_n}$$

and for $n$ complex values $b_1, \ldots, b_{n}$, $\frac{-b_1}{1+b_1+} \, \frac{-b_2}{1+b_2+} \cdots \frac{-b_n}{1+b_n} \ne -1.$

Proof: We perform a double induction. For $n=1$, we have

$$\frac{a_0}{1+} \, \frac{-a_1}{1+a_1} = \frac{a_0}{1+\frac{-a_1}{1+a_1}} = \frac{a_0(1+a_1)}{1} = a_0 + a_0 a_1
= \sum_{k=0}^1 \prod_{j=0}^k a_j$$

and

$$\frac{-b_1}{1+b_1}\ne -1.$$

Now suppose both statements are true for some $n \ge 1$.

We have $\frac{-b_1}{1+b_1+} \, \frac{-b_2}{1+b_2+} \cdots \frac{-b_{n+1}}{1+b_{n+1}} = \frac{-b_1}{1+b_1+x}$ where $x = \frac{-b_2}{1+b_2+} \cdots \frac{-b_{n+1}}{1+b_{n+1}} \ne -1$

by applying the induction hypothesis to $b_2, \ldots, b_{n+1}$.

But if $\frac{-b_1}{1+b_1+x} = -1$ implies $b_1 = 1+b_1+x$ implies $x = -1$, contradiction. Hence

$$\frac{-b_1}{1+b_1+} \, \frac{-b_2}{1+b_2+} \cdots \frac{-b_{n+1}}{1+b_{n+1}} \ne -1,$$

completing that induction.

Note that for $x \ne -1$,

$$\frac{1}{1+} \, \frac{-a}{1+a+x} = \frac{1}{1-\frac{a}{1+a+x}} = \frac{1+a+x}{1+x} = 1 + \frac{a}{1+x};$$

if $x=-1-a$, then both sides are zero.

Using $a=a_1$ and $x = \frac{-a_2}{1+a_2+} \, \cdots \frac{-a_{n+1}}{1+a_{n+1}} \ne -1$, and applying the induction hypothesis to the values $a_1, a_2, \ldots, a_{n+1}$,

$$\begin{align}
a_0 + & a_0a_1 + a_0a_1a_2 + \cdots + a_0a_1a_2a_3 \cdots a_{n+1} \\
&= a_0 + a_0(a_1 + a_1a_2 + \cdots + a_1a_2a_3 \cdots a_{n+1}) \\
&= a_0 + a_0 \big( \frac{a_1}{1+} \, \frac{-a_2}{1+a_2+} \, \cdots \frac{-a_{n+1}}{1+a_{n+1}} \big)\\
&= a_0 \big(1 + \frac{a_1}{1+} \, \frac{-a_2}{1+a_2+} \, \cdots \frac{-a_{n+1}}{1+a_{n+1}} \big)\\
&= a_0 \big(\frac{1}{1+} \, \frac{-a_1}{1+a_1+} \, \frac{-a_2}{1+a_2+} \, \cdots \frac{-a_{n+1}}{1+a_{n+1}} \big)\\
&= \frac{a_0}{1+} \, \frac{-a_1}{1+a_1+} \, \frac{-a_2}{1+a_2+} \, \cdots \frac{-a_{n+1}}{1+a_{n+1}},
\end{align}$$

completing the other induction.

As an example, the expression $a_0 + a_0a_1 + a_0a_1a_2 + a_0a_1a_2a_3$ can be rearranged into a continued fraction.

$$\begin{align}
& a_0 + a_0a_1 + a_0a_1a_2 + a_0a_1a_2a_3 \\[8pt]
= {} & a_0(a_1(a_2(a_3 + 1) + 1) + 1) \\[8pt]
= {} & \cfrac{a_0}{\cfrac{1}{a_1(a_2(a_3 + 1) + 1) + 1}} \\[8pt]
= {} & \cfrac{a_0}{\cfrac{a_1(a_2(a_3 + 1) + 1) + 1}{a_1(a_2(a_3 + 1) + 1) + 1} - \cfrac{a_1(a_2(a_3 + 1) + 1)}{a_1(a_2(a_3 + 1) + 1) + 1}} = \cfrac{a_0}{1 - \cfrac{a_1(a_2(a_3 + 1) + 1)}{a_1(a_2(a_3 + 1) + 1) + 1}} \\[8pt]
= {} & \cfrac{a_0}{1 - \cfrac{a_1}{\cfrac{a_1(a_2(a_3 + 1) + 1) + 1}{a_2(a_3 + 1) + 1}}} \\[8pt]
= {} & \cfrac{a_0}{1 - \cfrac{a_1}{\cfrac{a_1(a_2(a_3 + 1) + 1)}{a_2(a_3 + 1) + 1} + \cfrac{a_2(a_3 + 1) + 1}{a_2(a_3 + 1) + 1} - \cfrac{a_2(a_3 + 1)}{a_2(a_3 + 1) + 1}}} = \cfrac{a_0}{1 - \cfrac{a_1}{1 + a_1 - \cfrac{a_2(a_3 + 1)}{a_2(a_3 + 1) + 1}}} \\[8pt]
= {} & \cfrac{a_0}{1 - \cfrac{a_1}{1 + a_1 - \cfrac{a_2}{\cfrac{a_2(a_3 + 1) + 1}{a_3 + 1}}}} \\[8pt]
= {} & \cfrac{a_0}{1 - \cfrac{a_1}{1 + a_1 - \cfrac{a_2}{\cfrac{a_2(a_3 + 1)}{a_3 + 1} + \cfrac{a_3 + 1}{a_3 + 1} - \cfrac{a_3}{a_3 + 1}}}} = \cfrac{a_0}{1 - \cfrac{a_1}{1 + a_1 - \cfrac{a_2}{1 + a_2 - \cfrac{a_3}{1 + a_3}}}}
\end{align}$$

This can be applied to a sequence of any length, and will therefore also apply in the infinite case.

== Examples ==
=== The exponential function ===
The exponential function e^{x} is an entire function with a power series expansion that converges uniformly on every bounded domain in the complex plane.

$$e^x = 1 + \sum_{n=1}^\infty \frac{x^n}{n!} = 1 + \sum_{n=1}^\infty \left(\prod_{i=1}^n \frac{x}{i}\right)\,$$

The application of Euler's continued fraction formula is straightforward:

$$e^x = \cfrac{1}{1 - \cfrac{x}{1 + x - \cfrac{\frac{1}{2}x}{1 + \frac{1}{2}x - \cfrac{\frac{1}{3}x}
{1 + \frac{1}{3}x - \cfrac{\frac{1}{4}x}{1 + \frac{1}{4}x - \ddots}}}}}.\,$$

Applying an equivalence transformation that consists of clearing the fractions this example is simplified to

$$e^x = \cfrac{1}{1 - \cfrac{x}{1 + x - \cfrac{x}{2 + x - \cfrac{2x}{3 + x - \cfrac{3x}{4 + x - \ddots}}}}}\,$$

and we can be certain that this continued fraction converges uniformly on every bounded domain in the complex plane because it is equivalent to the power series for e^{x}.

=== The natural logarithm ===
The Taylor series for the principal branch of the natural logarithm in the neighborhood of 1 is well known:

$$\log(1+x) = x - \frac{x^2}{2} + \frac{x^3}{3} - \frac{x^4}{4} + \cdots =
\sum_{n=1}^\infty \frac{(-1)^{n+1}x^{n}}{n}.\,$$

This series converges when |x| < 1 and can also be expressed as a sum of products:

$$\log (1+x) = x + (x)\left(\frac{-x}{2}\right) + (x)\left(\frac{-x}{2}\right)\left(\frac{-2x}{3}\right) + (x)\left(\frac{-x}{2}\right)\left(\frac{-2x}{3}\right)\left(\frac{-3x}{4}\right) + \cdots$$

Applying Euler's continued fraction formula to this expression shows that

$$\log (1+x) = \cfrac{x}{1 - \cfrac{\frac{-x}{2}}{1+\frac{-x}{2}-\cfrac{\frac{-2x}{3}}{1+\frac{-2x}{3}-\cfrac{\frac{-3x}{4}}{1+\frac{-3x}{4}-\ddots}}}}$$

and using an equivalence transformation to clear all the fractions results in

$$\log (1+x) = \cfrac{x}{1+\cfrac{x}{2-x+\cfrac{2^2x}{3-2x+\cfrac{3^2x}{4-3x+\ddots}}}}$$

This continued fraction converges when |x| < 1 because it is equivalent to the series from which it was derived.

=== The trigonometric functions ===
The Taylor series of the sine function converges over the entire complex plane and can be expressed as the sum of products.

$$\begin{align}
\sin x = \sum^{\infty}_{n=0} \frac{(-1)^n}{(2n+1)!} x^{2n+1} & = x - \frac{x^3}{3!} + \frac{x^5}{5!} - \frac{x^7}{7!} + \frac{x^9}{9!} - \cdots \\[8pt]
& = x + (x)\left(\frac{-x^2}{2 \cdot 3}\right) + (x)\left(\frac{-x^2}{2 \cdot 3}\right)\left(\frac{-x^2}{4 \cdot 5}\right) + (x)\left(\frac{-x^2}{2 \cdot 3}\right)\left(\frac{-x^2}{4 \cdot 5}\right)\left(\frac{-x^2}{6 \cdot 7}\right) + \cdots
\end{align}$$

Euler's continued fraction formula can then be applied

$$\cfrac{x}{1 - \cfrac{\frac{-x^2}{2 \cdot 3}}{1 + \frac{-x^2}{2 \cdot 3} - \cfrac{\frac{-x^2}{4 \cdot 5}}{1 + \frac{-x^2}{4 \cdot 5} - \cfrac{\frac{-x^2}{6 \cdot 7}}{1 + \frac{-x^2}{6 \cdot 7} - \ddots}}}}$$

An equivalence transformation is used to clear the denominators:

$$\sin x = \cfrac{x}{1 + \cfrac{x^2}{2 \cdot 3 - x^2 + \cfrac{2 \cdot 3x^2}{4 \cdot 5 - x^2 + \cfrac{4 \cdot 5x^2}{6 \cdot 7 - x^2 + \ddots}}}}.$$

The same argument can be applied to the cosine function:

$$\begin{align}
\cos x =  \sum^{\infty}_{n=0} \frac{(-1)^n}{(2n)!} x^{2n} & = 1 - \frac{x^2}{2!} + \frac{x^4}{4!} - \frac{x^6}{6!} + \frac{x^8}{8!} - \cdots \\[8pt]
& = 1 + \frac{-x^2}{2} + \left(\frac{-x^2}{2}\right)\left(\frac{-x^2}{ 3 \cdot 4}\right) + \left(\frac{-x^2}{2}\right)\left(\frac{-x^2}{ 3 \cdot 4}\right)\left(\frac{-x^2}{ 5 \cdot 6}\right) + \cdots \\[8pt] & = \cfrac{1}{1 - \cfrac{\frac{-x^2}{2}}{1 + \frac{-x^2}{2} - \cfrac{\frac{-x^2}{3 \cdot 4}}{1 + \frac{-x^2}{3 \cdot 4} - \cfrac{\frac{-x^2}{5 \cdot 6}}{1 + \frac{-x^2}{5 \cdot 6} - \ddots}}}}
\end{align}$$
$$\therefore \cos x = \cfrac{1}{1 + \cfrac{x^2}{2 - x^2 + \cfrac{2x^2}{3 \cdot 4 - x^2 + \cfrac{3 \cdot 4x^2}{5 \cdot 6 - x^2 + \ddots}}}}.$$

==== The inverse trigonometric functions ====
The inverse trigonometric functions can be represented as continued fractions.

$$\begin{align}
\arcsin x = \sum_{n=0}^\infty \frac{(2n-1)!!}{(2n)!!} \cdot \frac{x^{2n+1}}{2n+1} & = x + \left( \frac{1}{2} \right) \frac{x^3}{3} + \left( \frac{1 \cdot 3}{2 \cdot 4} \right) \frac{x^5}{5} + \left( \frac{1 \cdot 3 \cdot 5}{2 \cdot 4 \cdot 6} \right) \frac{x^7}{7} + \cdots \\[8pt]
& = x + x \left(\frac{x^2}{2 \cdot 3}\right) + x \left(\frac{x^2}{2 \cdot 3}\right)\left(\frac{(3x)^2}{4 \cdot 5}\right) + x \left(\frac{x^2}{2 \cdot 3}\right)\left(\frac{(3x)^2}{4 \cdot 5}\right)\left(\frac{(5x)^2}{6 \cdot 7}\right) + \cdots \\[8pt]
& = \cfrac{x}{1 - \cfrac{\frac{x^2}{2 \cdot 3}}{1 + \frac{x^2}{2 \cdot 3} - \cfrac{\frac{(3x)^2}{4 \cdot 5}}{1 + \frac{(3x)^2}{4 \cdot 5} - \cfrac{\frac{(5x)^2}{6 \cdot 7}}{ 1 + \frac{(5x)^2}{6 \cdot 7} - \ddots}}}}
\end{align}$$

An equivalence transformation yields

$$\arcsin x = \cfrac{x}{1 - \cfrac{x^2}{2 \cdot 3 + x^2 - \cfrac{2 \cdot 3 (3x)^2}{4 \cdot 5 +(3x)^2 - \cfrac{4 \cdot 5 (5x)^2}{6 \cdot 7 + (5x)^2 - \ddots}}}}.$$

The continued fraction for the inverse tangent is straightforward:

$$\begin{align}
\arctan x = \sum_{n=0}^\infty (-1)^n \frac{x^{2n + 1}}{2n + 1}  & = x - \frac{x^3}{3} + \frac{x^5}{5} - \frac{x^7}{7} + \cdots \\[8pt]
& = x + x \left(\frac{-x^2}{3}\right) + x \left(\frac{-x^2}{3}\right)\left(\frac{-3x^2}{5}\right) + x \left(\frac{-x^2}{3}\right)\left(\frac{-3x^2}{5}\right)\left(\frac{-5x^2}{7}\right) + \cdots \\[8pt]
& = \cfrac{x}{1 - \cfrac{\frac{-x^2}{3}}{1 + \frac{-x^2}{3} - \cfrac{\frac{-3x^2}{5}}{1 + \frac{-3x^2}{5} - \cfrac{\frac{-5x^2}{7}}{1 + \frac{-5x^2}{7} - \ddots}}}} \\[8pt]
& = \cfrac{x}{1 + \cfrac{x^2}{3 - x^2 + \cfrac{(3x)^2}{5 - 3x^2 + \cfrac{(5x)^2}{7 - 5x^2 + \ddots}}}}.
\end{align}$$

=== A continued fraction for π ===
We can use the previous example involving the inverse tangent to construct a continued fraction representation of π. We note that

$$\tan^{-1} (1) = \frac\pi4 ,$$

And setting x = 1 in the previous result, we obtain immediately

$$\pi = \cfrac{4}{1 + \cfrac{1^2}{2 + \cfrac{3^2}{2 + \cfrac{5^2}{2 + \cfrac{7^2}{2 + \ddots}}}}}.\,$$

=== The hyperbolic functions ===
Recalling the relationship between the hyperbolic functions and the trigonometric functions,

$$\sin ix = i \sinh x$$
$$\cos ix = \cosh x ,$$

And that $i^2 = -1,$ the following continued fractions are easily derived from the ones above:

$$\sinh x = \cfrac{x}{1 - \cfrac{x^2}{2 \cdot 3 + x^2 - \cfrac{2 \cdot 3x^2}{4 \cdot 5 + x^2 - \cfrac{4 \cdot 5x^2}{6 \cdot 7 + x^2 - \ddots}}}}$$
$$\cosh x = \cfrac{1}{1 - \cfrac{x^2}{2 + x^2 - \cfrac{2x^2}{3 \cdot 4 + x^2 - \cfrac{3 \cdot 4x^2}{5 \cdot 6 + x^2 - \ddots}}}}.$$

==== The inverse hyperbolic functions ====
The inverse hyperbolic functions are related to the inverse trigonometric functions similar to how the hyperbolic functions are related to the trigonometric functions,

$$\sin^{-1} ix = i \sinh^{-1} x$$
$$\tan^{-1} ix = i \tanh^{-1} x ,$$

And these continued fractions are easily derived:

$$\sinh^{-1} x = \cfrac{x}{1 + \cfrac{x^2}{2 \cdot 3 - x^2 + \cfrac{2 \cdot 3 (3x)^2}{4 \cdot 5 - (3x)^2 + \cfrac{4 \cdot 5 (5x^2)}{6 \cdot 7 - (5x^2) + \ddots}}}}$$
$$\tanh^{-1} x = \cfrac{x}{1 - \cfrac{x^2}{3 + x^2 - \cfrac{(3x)^2}{5 + 3x^2 - \cfrac{(5x)^2}{7 + 5x^2 - \ddots}}}}.$$

== See also ==
- Engel expansion
- Gauss's continued fraction
- List of topics named after Leonhard Euler
