= Śleszyński–Pringsheim theorem =

Criterion for convergence of continued fractions

In mathematics, the Śleszyński–Pringsheim theorem is a statement about convergence of certain continued fractions. It was discovered by Ivan Śleszyński and Alfred Pringsheim in the late 19th century.

It states that if $n$ is a positive integer and $(a_n)$, $(b_n)$ are sequences of real numbers such that $|b_n| \geq |a_n| + 1$ for all $n$, then

$$\cfrac{a_1}{b_1 + \cfrac{a_2}{b_2 + \cfrac{a_3}{b_3 + \ddots}}}$$

converges absolutely to a number $x$ satisfying $|x| \leq 1$, meaning that the series

$$x = \sum_n \left\{ \frac{A_n}{B_n} - \frac{A_{n - 1}}{B_{n - 1}} \right\},$$

where $A_n / B_n$ are the convergents of the continued fraction, converges absolutely.

== Proof ==
Recall that the $n$th convergents of $x$, which will be denoted by $\tfrac{A_n}{B_n}$ in this article, can be computed from the following recurrence relation:

$$\begin{align}
A_n &:= b_n A_{n - 1} + a_n A_{n - 2} \\
B_n &:= b_n B_{n - 1} + a_n B_{n - 2}, \qquad n \geq 2
\end{align}$$

where $A_0 = 0$, $A_1 = a_1$, $B_0 = 1$, and $B_1 = b_1$. See this article for more detail.

=== nth convergent as a series ===
First, we will prove the following claim via mathematical induction

Claim—For all positive integers $n$, then
$$A_n B_{n - 1} - A_{n - 1} B_n = (-1)^{n - 1} a_1 a_2 \cdots a_n$$

Proof

The case $n = 1$ is trivial.

Suppose the claim is true for $n = k$. By using the two recurrence relation above, it follows that

$$\begin{align}
A_{k + 1} B_k - A_k B_{k + 1} &= \left( b_{k + 1} A_k + a_{k + 1} A_{k - 1} \right) B_k - A_k \left( b_{k + 1} B_k + a_{k + 1} B_{k - 1} \right) \\
&= b_{k + 1} A_k B_k + a_{k + 1} A_{k - 1} B_k - b_{k + 1} A_k B_k - a_{k + 1} A_k B_{k - 1} \\
&= a_{k + 1} A_{k - 1} B_k - a_{k + 1} A_k B_{k - 1} \\
&= - a_{k + 1} \left( A_k B_{k - 1} - A_{k - 1} B_k \right) \\
&= - a_{k + 1} \cdot (-1)^{k - 1} a_1 a_2 \cdots a_k \\
&= (-1)^k a_1 a_2 \cdots a_k a_{k + 1}
\end{align}$$

which finishes the induction step.

By dividing both sides of the claim by $B_n \cdot B_{n - 1}$, the equation becomes

$$\dfrac{A_n}{B_n} - \dfrac{A_{n - 1}}{B_{n - 1}} = (-1)^{n - 1} \dfrac{a_1 a_2 \cdots a_n}{B_{n - 1} \cdot B_n}$$

Thus,

$$\begin{align}
\sum_{i \, = \, 1}^{n} \dfrac{A_i}{B_i} - \dfrac{A_{i - 1}}{B_{i - 1}} &= \sum_{i \, = \, 1}^{n} (-1)^{i - 1} \dfrac{a_1 a_2 \cdots a_i}{B_{i - 1} B_i} \\
\dfrac{A_n}{B_n} - \dfrac{A_0}{B_0} &= \dfrac{a_1}{B_0 B_1} - \dfrac{a_1 a_2}{B_1 B_2} + \dfrac{a_1 a_2 a_3}{B_2 B_3} - \ldots + (-1)^{n - 1} \dfrac{a_1 a_2 \cdots a_n}{B_{n - 1} B_n} \\
\dfrac{A_n}{B_n} &= \dfrac{a_1}{B_0 B_1} - \dfrac{a_1 a_2}{B_1 B_2} + \dfrac{a_1 a_2 a_3}{B_2 B_3} - \ldots + (-1)^{n - 1} \dfrac{a_1 a_2 \cdots a_n}{B_{n - 1} B_n}
\end{align}$$

=== Absolute value of nth convergent as a series ===
Now suppose that $|b_n| \geq |a_n| + 1$ for all $n$. Using the recurrence relation of $(B_n)$, note that

$$\left| b_n B_{n - 1} \right| = \left| B_n - a_n B_{n - 2} \right| \leq \left| B_n \right| + \left| a_n B_{n - 2} \right|.$$

Thus,

$$\begin{align}
\left| B_n \right| &\geq \left| b_n \right| \left| B_{n - 1} \right| - \left| a_n \right| \left| B_{n - 2} \right| \\
&\geq \left( \left| a_n \right| + 1 \right) \left| B_{n - 1} \right| - \left| a_n \right| \left| B_{n - 2} \right| \\
\left| B_n \right| - \left| B_{n - 1} \right| &\geq \left| a_n \right| \left( \left| B_{n - 1} \right| - \left| B_{n - 2} \right| \right)
\end{align}$$

Since $\left| B_1 \right| - \left| B_0 \right| = \left| b_1 \right| - 1 \geq \left| a_1 \right|$ by assumption, then by using mathematical induction, one can show that

$$\left| B_n \right| - \left| B_{n - 1} \right| \geq \prod_{i \, = \, 1}^{n} \left| a_i \right|.$$

Consequently, the sequence of $\left| B_n \right|$ is monotone nondecreasing and bounded from below by $\left| B_0 \right| = 1$. Moreover,

$$\dfrac{1}{\left| B_n B_{n - 1} \right|} \prod_{i \, = \, 1}^{n} \left| a_i \right| \leq \dfrac{\left| B_n \right| - \left| B_{n - 1} \right|}{\left| B_n B_{n - 1} \right|} = \dfrac{1}{\left| B_{n - 1} \right|} - \dfrac{1}{\left| B_n \right|}$$

Since the right-hand side forms a telescoping series, it is easy to see that

$$\dfrac{\left| a_1 \right|}{\left| B_0 B_1 \right|} + \dfrac{\left| a_1 a_2 \right|}{\left| B_1 B_2 \right|} + \ldots + \dfrac{\left| a_1 a_2 \cdots a_n \right|}{\left| B_{n - 1} B_n \right|} \leq \dfrac{1}{\left| B_0 \right|} - \dfrac{1}{\left| B_n \right|} = 1 - \dfrac{1}{\left| B_n \right|} < 1$$

for all values of $n$. Furthermore, the nondecreasing property of the sequence $\left| B_n \right|$ also implies the nondecreasing property of the sequence $1 - \tfrac{1}{\left| B_n \right|}$. Thus, the sequence $1 - \tfrac{1}{\left| B_n \right|}$ must converge, by the monotone convergence theorem.

Note that the left-hand side is the upper bound of series representation of $\left| \tfrac{A_n}{B_n} \right|$ after applying triangle inequality, which completes the proof.

== See also ==
- Convergence problem
