= Jan Śleszyński =

Polish-Russian mathematician (1854–1931)

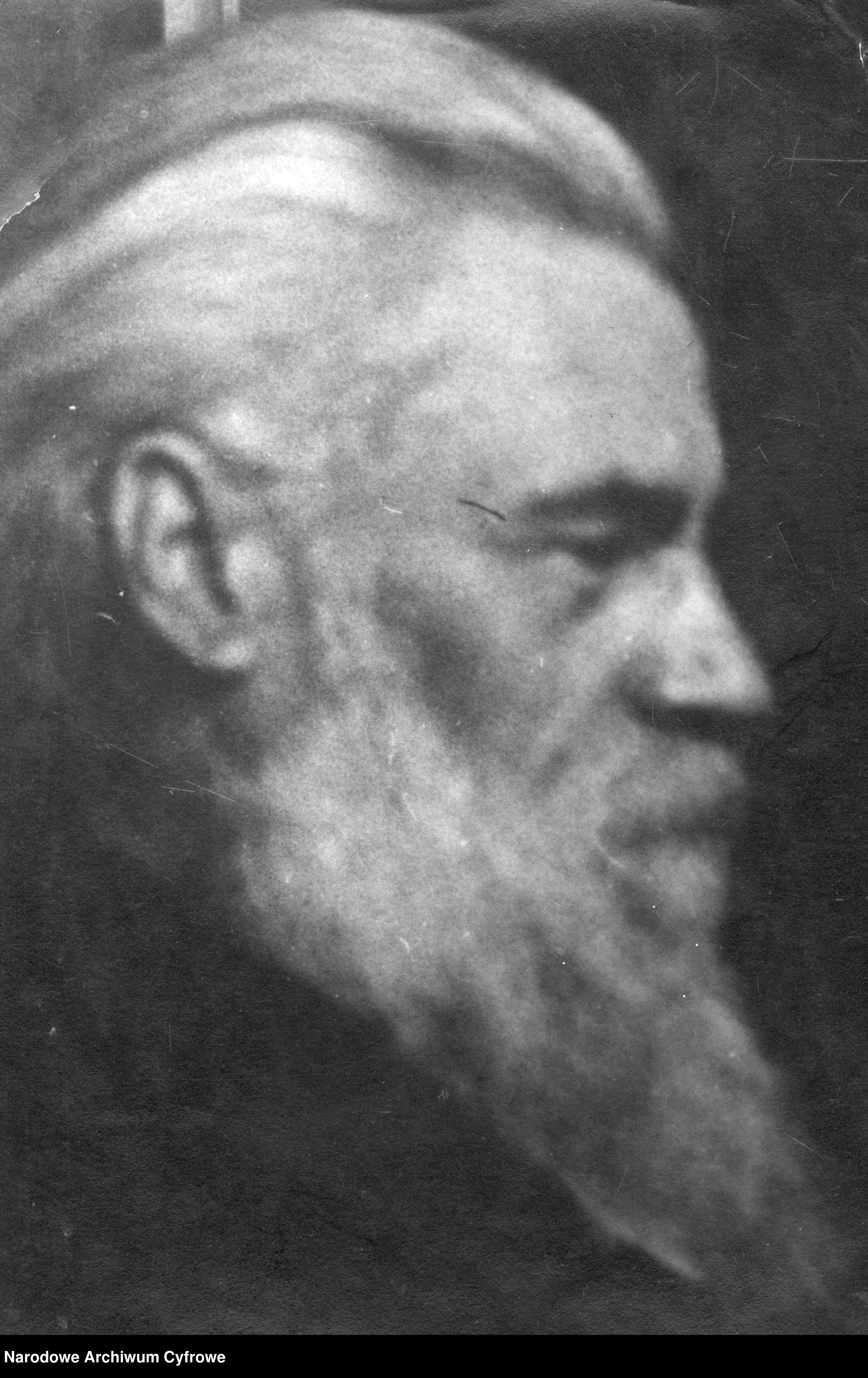
- Born: 23 July 1854; Lysianka, Kiev Governorate, Russian Empire (present-day Ukraine)
- Died: 9 March 1931 (aged 76); Kraków, Poland
- Resting place: Rakowicki Cemetery
- Education: Odesa University; University of Berlin
- Known for: Śleszyński-Pringsheim theorem
- Spouse: Helena Augustynowicz
- Scientific career
- Fields: Mathematics
- Workplaces: Odesa University; Jagiellonian University
- Notable students: Stanisław Zaremba

Ivan Vladislavovich Sleshinsky or Jan Śleszyński (Russian: Иван Владиславович Слешинский) (Polish: [ɕlɛˈʂɨɲski]; 23 July 1854 – 9 March 1931) was a Polish-Russian mathematician. He is regarded a pioneer of the study of logic in Poland.

He worked as professor at the Odesa University and the Jagiellonian University, and was the co-founder of the Polish Mathematical Society. His main areas of interest included continued fractions, proof theory and mathematical logic. He is best known for introducing the Śleszyński-Pringsheim theorem.

== Life and career ==
Śleszyński was born on 23 July 1853 in Lysianka, Russian Empire (present-day Ukraine) to Polish parents. In 1864, Śleszyński attended gymnasium in Chișinău. After four years, he transferred to the A. Richelieu Gymnasium in Odesa finishing it with distinction.

He matriculated at the Odesa University to study mathematics, graduating in 1875. In 1880, after having received a scholarship, Śleszyński continued his studies attending lectures by Karl Weierstrass and Leopold Kronecker at the University of Berlin where he earned his doctorate in 1882. Upon his return to Odesa, he was awarded the title of professor at his alma mater, occupying the post from 1883 until 1909. He taught algebra, number theory, group theory, the calculus of variations, and the theory of analytic functions at the university. At the same time, he worked as a mathematics teacher at a local theological seminary, secondary schools in Odesa, and at the Higher Women’s Courses. In the 1890s, Śleszyński became a leading figure among the mathematicians in Odesa influencing such scholars as Samuil Shatunovsky and Benjamin Kagan.

In 1909, the publication of Śleszyński's translation of Louis Couturat's book The Algebra of Logic was released. His version went well beyond a simple translation as it was enriched with his own valuable commentary exerting a substantial impact on the development of mathematical logic in Russia and serving for many years as the principal textbook for students of the field.

In 1911, he moved to Poland, where he became "extraordinary professor" at the Jagiellonian University in Kraków. Among his notable students was Stanisław Zaremba. In 1919, Śleszyński was one of the founding members of the Polish Mathematical Society. In the same year, he was appointed full Professor of Logic and Mathematics lecturing at the university until his retirement in 1924. In 1925, he received the title of an honorary professor of the Jagiellonian University. He was a member of the Kraków Philosophical Society (Polish: Towarzystwo Filozoficzne w Krakowie).

He died on 9 March 1931 in Kraków and was buried at the Rakowicki Cemetery.

=== Contributions ===
In his 1892 paper, based on his doctoral thesis, Śleszyński revisited Cauchy’s formulation of the Central limit theorem applying characteristic functions, and introducing several important corrections and refinements.

Śleszyński's main work was on continued fractions, least squares and axiomatic proof theory based on mathematical logic. He and Alfred Pringsheim, working separately, proved what is now called the Śleszyński–Pringsheim theorem.

Śleszyński upheld the autonomy of logic with respect to mathematics, arguing that logic cannot be reduced to a mere methodological instrument of mathematical practice.

His most important publications include: Teoria dowodu (The theory of proof) in two volumes (1925, 1929), and Teoria wyznaczników (The theory of determinants) (1926).

== See also ==
- History of philosophy in Poland
- List of Poles
- Convergence problem
