= Sobolev orthogonal polynomials =

In mathematics, Sobolev orthogonal polynomials are orthogonal polynomials with respect to a Sobolev inner product, i.e. an inner product with derivatives.

By having conditions on the derivatives, the Sobolev orthogonal polynomials in general no longer share some of the nice features that classical orthogonal polynomials have.

Sobolev orthogonal polynomials are named after Sergei Lvovich Sobolev.

== Definition ==
Let $\mu_0,\mu_1,\dots,\mu_n$ be positive Borel measures on $\mathbb{R}$ with finite moments. Consider the inner product

$$\langle p_r,p_s \rangle_{W^{n,2}}=\int_{\mathbb{R}}p_r(x) p_s(x)\;\mathrm{d}\mu_0+\sum\limits_{k=1}^{n}\int_{\mathbb{R}}p_r^{(k)}(x) p_s^{(k)}(x)\;\mathrm{d}\mu_k$$

and let $W^{n,2}$ be the corresponding Sobolev space. The Sobolev orthogonal polynomials $\{p_n\}_{n\geq 0}$ are defined as

$$\langle p_n,p_s \rangle_{W^{n,2}}=c_n\delta_{n,s}$$

where $\delta_{n,s}$ denotes the Kronecker delta. One says that these polynomials are sobolev orthogonal.

== Explanation ==
- Classical orthogonal polynomials are Sobolev orthogonal polynomials, since their derivatives are also orthogonal polynomials.
- Sobolev orthogonal polynomials in general are no longer commutative in the multiplication operator with respect to the inner product, i.e.

$$\langle xp_n,p_s\rangle_{W^{n,2}}\neq\langle p_n,xp_s\rangle_{W^{n,2}}$$

Consequently neither Favard's theorem, the three term recurrence or the Christoffel-Darboux formula hold. There exist however other recursion formulas for certain types of measures.

- There exist a lot of literature for the case $n=1$.

== Literature ==
- Marcellán, Francisco; Xu, Yuan (2015). "On Sobolev orthogonal polynomials". Expositiones Mathematicae. 33 (3): 308–352. arXiv:1403.6249.
- Marcellán, Francisco; Moreno-Balcázar, Juan (2017). "WHAT IS... a Sobolev Orthogonal Polynomial?". Notices of the American Mathematical Society. 64: 873–875. doi:10.1090/noti1562.
