= Jean Favard =

French mathematician (1902–1965)

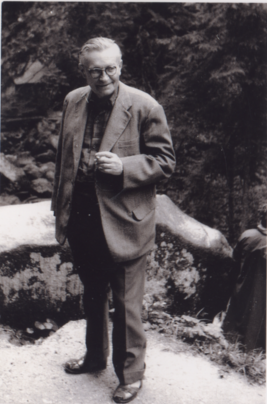
- Oberwolfach 1963]
- Born: 28 August 1902; Peyrat-la-Nonière, France
- Died: 21 January 1965 (aged 62); La Tronche, France
- Known for: Affine geometry of curves Favard constant Favard length Favard operator Favard theorem Akhiezer–Krein–Favard theorem Bohr–Favard inequality
- Awards: Prix Francoeur (1934); Peccot Lecture (1929)
- Scientific career
- Fields: Mathematics

Jean Favard (28 August 1902 – 21 January 1965) was a French mathematician who worked on analysis.

Favard was born in Peyrat-la-Nonière. During World War II he was a prisoner of war in Germany.

He also was a President of the French Mathematical Society in 1946. He died in La Tronche, aged 62.

== See also ==
- Favard measure
- Favard inequality
- Favard interpolation
- Favard problem
