= Favard's theorem =

In mathematics, Favard's theorem, also called the Shohat–Favard theorem, states that a sequence of polynomials satisfying a suitable three-term recurrence relation is a sequence of orthogonal polynomials. The theorem was introduced in the theory of orthogonal polynomials by Favard (1935) and Shohat (1938), though essentially the same theorem was used by Stieltjes in the theory of continued fractions many years before Favard's paper, and was rediscovered several times by other authors before Favard's work.

== Statement ==
Suppose that $\{y_0, y_1, \dots \}$ is a sequence of polynomials, where $y_n$ has degree $n$ and $y_0 = 1$. If this is a sequence of orthogonal polynomials for some positive weight function then it satisfies a three-term recurrence relation. Favard's theorem is roughly a converse of this, and states that if these polynomials satisfy a three-term recurrence relation of the form

$$y_{n+1}= (x-c_n)y_n - d_n y_{n-1}$$

for some numbers $c_n$ and $d_n$, then the polynomials $y_n$ form an orthogonal sequence for some linear functional $\Lambda$ with $\Lambda(1)=1$; in other words $\Lambda(y_m y_n)=0$ if $m \neq n$.

The linear functional $\Lambda$ is unique, and is given by $\Lambda(1)=1$, $\Lambda(y_n)=0$ if $n>0$.

The functional $\Lambda$ satisfies $\Lambda(y_n^2)=d_n \, \Lambda(y^2_{n-1})$, which implies that $\Lambda$ is positive definite if (and only if) the numbers $c_n$ are real and the numbers $d_n$ are positive.

== See also ==
- Jacobi operator
- James Alexander Shohat
- Jean Favard
