= Favard operator =

Functional analysis operator

In functional analysis, a branch of mathematics, the Favard operators are defined by:

$$[\mathcal{F}_n(f)](x) = \frac{1}{\sqrt{n\pi}} \sum_{k=-\infty}^\infty {\exp{\left({-n {\left({\frac{k}{n}-x}\right)}^2 }\right)} f\left(\frac{k}{n}\right)}$$

where $x\in\mathbb{R}$, $n\in\mathbb{N}$. They are named after Jean Favard.

== Generalizations ==
A common generalization is:

$$[\mathcal{F}_n(f)](x) = \frac{1}{n\gamma_n\sqrt{2\pi}} \sum_{k=-\infty}^\infty {\exp{\left({\frac{-1}{2\gamma_n^2} {\left({\frac{k}{n}-x}\right)}^2 }\right)} f\left(\frac{k}{n}\right)}$$

where $(\gamma_n)_{n=1}^\infty$ is a positive sequence that converges to 0. This reduces to the classical Favard operators when $\gamma_n^2=1/(2n)$.
