= J. C. P. Miller =

British mathematician and computing pioneer (1906–1981)

Jeffrey Charles Percy Miller (31 August 1906 – 24 April 1981) was an English mathematician and computing pioneer. He worked in number theory and on geometry, particularly polyhedra, where Miller's monster is a nickname of the great dirhombicosidodecahedron.

== Early life and education ==
Miller was born at Isleworth, Middlesex (now West London), and educated at St Paul's School, London and Trinity College, Cambridge (BA 1928, MA 1931, PhD 1933).

== Career ==
He was an early member of the Computing Laboratory of the University of Cambridge. He contributed in computation to the construction and documentation of mathematical tables, and by the proposal of certain algorithms. Miller's recurrence algorithm is mentioned in the Handbook of Mathematical Functions.

What Miller perceived was that in a second-order linear recurrence which has solutions sufficiently differentiated asymptotically, there is a solution that may be uniquely characterized by one initial value and a knowledge of its growth. This led to an algorithm for computing certain solutions of the equation which required only a scant knowledge of their pointwise values.

In volume 2 of The Art of Computer Programming, Donald Knuth attributes to Miller a basic technique on formal power series, for recursive evaluation of coefficients of powers or more general functions. (Note: Though often attributed to Miller, this result has been rediscovered several times, dating back to least as early as Euler's discovery in 1748.)

In the theory of stellation of polyhedra, he made some influential suggestions to H. S. M. Coxeter. These became known as Miller's rules. The 1938 book on the fifty-nine icosahedra resulted, written by Coxeter and Patrick du Val. In the 1930s, Coxeter and Miller found 12 new uniform polyhedra, a step in the process of their complete classification in the 1950s. Miller also made an early investigation into what is now known as the Rule 90 cellular automaton.

Miller was a Fellow of the Royal Astronomical Society from 1929; his obituary in the Society's journal noted his early interest and work in astronomy – including papers on the effect of distribution of density on the period of pulsation in a star, and on the effect of opacity in the point-source stellar model – and observed that, "but for a serious illness that interrupted his university postgraduate years, there is little doubt that [he] would have continued to work in the field of astronomy and would have made notable contributions to it."

== Personal life ==
In 1934, Miller married Germaine Gough. They had three children (David, Alison and Jane). Germaine died in Cambridge in her 100th year in March 2010 and is buried at St Andrew's Church, Chesterton, Cambridge.
