= Bohr–Favard inequality =

The Bohr–Favard inequality is an inequality appearing in a problem of Harald Bohr on the boundedness over the entire real axis of the integral of an almost-periodic function. The ultimate form of this inequality was given by Jean Favard; the latter materially supplemented the studies of Bohr, and studied the arbitrary periodic function

$f(x) = \ \sum _ { k=n } ^ \infty (a _ {k} \cos kx + b _ {k} \sin kx)$

with continuous derivative $f ^ {(r)} (x)$ for given constants $r$ and $n$ which are natural numbers. The accepted form of the Bohr–Favard inequality is

$\| f \| _ {C} \leq K \| f ^ {(r)} \| _ {C} ,$

$\| f \| _ {C} = \max _ {x \in [0, 2 \pi ] } | f(x) | ,$

with the best constant $K = K (n, r)$:

$K = \sup _ {\| f ^ {(r)} \| _ {C} \leq 1 } \ \| f \| _ {C} .$

The Bohr–Favard inequality is closely connected with the inequality for the best approximations of a function and its $r$^{th} derivative by trigonometric polynomials of an order at most $n$ and with the notion of Kolmogorov's width in the class of differentiable functions (cf. Width).
