= Complex plane =

Geometric representation of the complex numbers

The complex plane. The horizontal axis represents the real numbers $(\R)$, the vertical axis represents the imaginary numbers $(\mathbb{I})$. The complex number $4+4i$ is shown at the point $(4,4).$

In mathematics, the complex plane is the plane formed by the complex numbers, with a Cartesian coordinate system such that the horizontal x-axis, called the real axis, is formed by the real numbers, and the vertical y-axis, called the imaginary axis, is formed by the imaginary numbers.

The complex plane allows for a geometric interpretation of complex numbers. Under addition, they add like vectors. The multiplication of two complex numbers can be expressed more easily in polar coordinates: the magnitude or modulus of the product is the product of the two absolute values, or moduli, and the angle or argument of the product is the sum of the two angles, or arguments. In particular, multiplication by a complex number of modulus 1 acts as a rotation (the circle group).

The complex plane is sometimes called the Argand plane or Gauss plane.

== Notational conventions ==
=== Complex numbers ===
In complex analysis, the complex numbers are customarily represented by the symbol z, which can be separated into its real (x) and imaginary (y) parts:

$$z = x + iy$$

for example: z = 4 + 5i, where x and y are real numbers, and i is the imaginary unit. In this customary notation the complex number z corresponds to the point (x, y) in the Cartesian plane; the point (x, y) can also be represented in polar coordinates with:

$$\begin{align}
x &= r\cos\theta \\
y &= r\sin\theta \\
r &= \sqrt{x^2+y^2} \\
\theta &= \arctan\frac{y}{x}.
\end{align}$$

In the Cartesian plane it may be assumed that the range of the arctangent function takes the values (−π/2, π/2) (in radians), and some care must be taken to define the more complete arctangent function for points (x, y) when x ≤ 0. (Note: A detailed definition of the complex argument in terms of the complete arctangent can be found at the description of the atan2 function.) In the complex plane these polar coordinates take the form

$$\begin{align}
z &= x + iy \\
&= |z|\left(\cos\theta + i\sin\theta\right) \\
&= |z|e^{i\theta}
\end{align}$$

where (Note: All the familiar properties of the complex exponential function, the trigonometric functions, and the complex logarithm can be deduced directly from the power series for e^{z}. In particular, the principal value of log r, where |r| = 1, can be calculated without reference to any geometrical or trigonometric construction.)

$$\begin{align}
|z| &= \sqrt{x^2+y^2}  \\
\theta &= \arg(z)  \\
&= \frac{1}{i}\ln\frac{z}{|z|} \\
&= -i\ln\frac{z}{|z|}.
\end{align}$$

Here |z| is the absolute value or modulus of the complex number z; θ, the argument of z, is usually taken on the interval 0 ≤ θ < 2π; and the last equality (to |z|e^{iθ}) is taken from Euler's formula. Without the constraint on the range of θ, the argument of z is multi-valued, because the complex exponential function is periodic, with period 2πi. Thus, if θ is one value of arg(z), the other values are given by arg(z) = θ + 2nπ, where n is any non-zero integer.

While seldom used explicitly, the geometric view of the complex numbers is implicitly based on its structure of a Euclidean vector space of dimension 2, where the inner product of complex numbers w and z is given by $\Re(w\overline{z})$; then for a complex number z its absolute value |z| coincides with its Euclidean norm, and its argument arg(z) with the angle turning from 1 to z.

The theory of contour integration comprises a major part of complex analysis. In this context, the direction of travel around a closed curve is important – reversing the direction in which the curve is traversed multiplies the value of the integral by −1. By convention the positive direction is counterclockwise. For example, the unit circle is traversed in the positive direction when we start at the point z = 1, then travel up and to the left through the point z = i, then down and to the left through −1, then down and to the right through −i, and finally up and to the right to z = 1, where we started.

Almost all of complex analysis is concerned with complex functions – that is, with functions that map some subset of the complex plane into some other (possibly overlapping, or even identical) subset of the complex plane. Here it is customary to speak of the domain of f(z) as lying in the z-plane, while referring to the range of f(z) as a set of points in the w-plane. In symbols we write

$$\begin{align}
z &= x + iy \\
f(z) &= w \\
&= u + iv
\end{align}$$

and often think of the function f as a transformation from the z-plane (with coordinates (x, y)) into the w-plane (with coordinates (u, v)).

=== Complex plane notation ===
The complex plane is denoted as $\mathbb{C}$.

== Argand diagram ==
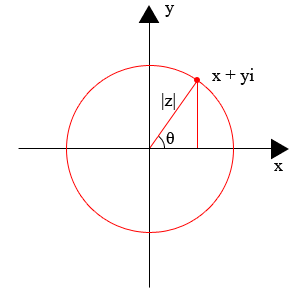
Geometric representation of the complex-valued point z = x + yi in the complex plane. The distance along the line from the origin to the point z = x + yi is the modulus or absolute value of z. The angle θ is the argument of z.

An Argand diagram is a geometric plot of complex numbers as points z = x + iy using the horizontal x-axis as the real axis and the vertical y-axis as the imaginary axis. Though named after Jean-Robert Argand (1768–1822), such plots were first described by Norwegian–Danish land surveyor and mathematician Caspar Wessel (1745–1818). (Note: Wessel's memoir was presented to the Danish Academy in 1797; Argand's paper was published in 1806.) Argand diagrams are frequently used to plot the positions of the zeros and poles of a function in the complex plane.

The lengths of straight lines and curves in the complex plane represent real numbers: the physical length of the line or curve divided by the physical length of the radius of the unit circle. Similarly, angles between any two rays emanating from any point in the complex plane represent real numbers: the radian measure of the physical angle (i.e. the number of radians in the angle). In particular, the argument (phase) of a complex number is a real number, not a physical angle.

== Stereographic projections ==
Riemann sphere which maps all points on a sphere except one to all points on the complex plane

It can be useful to think of the complex plane as if it occupied the surface of a sphere. Given a sphere of unit radius, place its center at the origin of the complex plane, oriented so that the equator on the sphere coincides with the unit circle in the plane, and the north pole is "above" the plane.

We can establish a one-to-one correspondence between the points on the surface of the sphere minus the north pole and the points in the complex plane as follows. Given a point in the plane, draw a straight line connecting it with the north pole on the sphere. That line will intersect the surface of the sphere in exactly one other point. The point z = 0 will be projected onto the south pole of the sphere. Since the interior of the unit circle lies inside the sphere, that entire region (|z| < 1) will be mapped onto the southern hemisphere. The unit circle itself (|z| = 1) will be mapped onto the equator, and the exterior of the unit circle (|z| > 1) will be mapped onto the northern hemisphere, minus the north pole. Clearly this procedure is reversible – given any point on the surface of the sphere that is not the north pole, we can draw a straight line connecting that point to the north pole and intersecting the flat plane in exactly one point.

Under this stereographic projection the north pole itself is not associated with any point in the complex plane. We perfect the one-to-one correspondence by adding one more point to the complex plane – the so-called point at infinity – and identifying it with the north pole on the sphere. This topological space, the complex plane plus the point at infinity, is known as the extended complex plane. In the same way, the real number line can be extended with a point at infinity. Restricting the stereographic projection to the real line $\R \sub \C$, the same construction results in the projectively extended real line. In both these cases one speaks of a single "point at infinity". These concepts ought to be distinguished from the extended real number line, which features two "points at infinity", namely $-\infty$ and $+\infty$.

Imagine for a moment what will happen to the lines of latitude and longitude when they are projected from the sphere onto the flat plane. The lines of latitude are all parallel to the equator, so they will become perfect circles centered on the origin z = 0. And the lines of longitude will become straight lines passing through the origin (and also through the "point at infinity", since they pass through both the north and south poles on the sphere).

This is not the only possible yet plausible stereographic situation of the projection of a sphere onto a plane consisting of two or more values. For instance, the north pole of the sphere might be placed on top of the origin z = −1 in a plane that is tangent to the circle. The details don't really matter. Any stereographic projection of a sphere onto a plane will produce one "point at infinity", and it will map the lines of latitude and longitude on the sphere into circles and straight lines, respectively, in the plane.

== Cutting the plane ==
When discussing functions of a complex variable it is often convenient to think of a cut in the complex plane. This idea arises naturally in several different contexts.

=== Multi-valued relationships and branch points ===
Consider the simple two-valued relationship

$$w = f(z) = \pm\sqrt{z} = z^{1/2}.$$

Before we can treat this relationship as a single-valued function, the range of the resulting value must be restricted somehow. When dealing with the square roots of non-negative real numbers this is easily done. For instance, we can just define

$$y = g(x) = \sqrt{x} = x^{1/2}$$

to be the non-negative real number y such that y^{2} = x. This idea doesn't work so well in the two-dimensional complex plane. To see why, let's think about the way the value of f(z) varies as the point z moves around the unit circle. We can write $z = re^{i\theta}$ and take
$$\begin{align}
w &= z^{1/2} \\
&= \sqrt{r}\,e^{i\theta/2}, \quad 0\leq\theta\leq 2\pi.
\end{align}$$

Evidently, as z moves all the way around the circle, w only traces out one-half of the circle. So one continuous motion in the complex plane has transformed the positive square root e^{0} = 1 into the negative square root e^{iπ} = −1.

This problem arises because the point z = 0 has just one square root, while every other complex number z ≠ 0 has exactly two square roots. On the real number line we could circumvent this problem by erecting a "barrier" at the single point x = 0. A bigger barrier is needed in the complex plane, to prevent any closed contour from completely encircling the branch point z = 0. This is commonly done by introducing a branch cut; in this case the "cut" might extend from the point z = 0 along the positive real axis to the point at infinity, so that the argument of the variable z in the cut plane is restricted to the range 0 ≤ arg(z) < 2π.

We can now give a complete description of w = z^{1/2}. To do so we need two copies of the z-plane, each of them cut along the real axis. On one copy we define the square root of 1 to be e^{0} = 1, and on the other we define the square root of 1 to be e^{iπ} = −1. We call these two copies of the complete cut plane sheets. By making a continuity argument we see that the (now single-valued) function w = z^{1/2} maps the first sheet into the upper half of the w-plane, where 0 ≤ arg(w) < π, while mapping the second sheet into the lower half of the w-plane (where π ≤ arg(w) < 2π).

The branch cut in this example does not have to lie along the real axis; it does not even have to be a straight line. Any continuous curve connecting the origin z = 0 with the point at infinity would work. In some cases the branch cut doesn't even have to pass through the point at infinity. For example, consider the relationship

$$w = g(z) = \left(z^2 - 1\right)^{1/2}.$$

Here the polynomial z^{2} − 1 vanishes when z = ±1, so g evidently has two branch points. We can "cut" the plane along the real axis, from −1 to 1, and obtain a sheet on which g(z) is a single-valued function. Alternatively, the cut can run from z = 1 along the positive real axis through the point at infinity, then continue "up" the negative real axis to the other branch point, z = −1.

This situation is most easily visualized by using the stereographic projection described above. On the sphere one of these cuts runs longitudinally through the southern hemisphere, connecting a point on the equator (z = −1) with another point on the equator (z = 1), and passing through the south pole (the origin, z = 0) on the way. The second version of the cut runs longitudinally through the northern hemisphere and connects the same two equatorial points by passing through the north pole (that is, the point at infinity).

=== Restricting the domain of meromorphic functions ===
A meromorphic function is a complex function that is holomorphic and therefore analytic everywhere in its domain except at a finite, or countably infinite, number of points. (Note: See also Proof that holomorphic functions are analytic.) The points at which such a function cannot be defined are called the poles of the meromorphic function. Sometimes all of these poles lie in a straight line. In that case mathematicians may say that the function is "holomorphic on the cut plane". By example:

The gamma function, defined by

$$\Gamma (z) = \frac{e^{-\gamma z}}{z} \prod_{n=1}^\infty \left[\left(1+\frac{z}{n}\right)^{-1}e^{z/n}\right]$$

where γ is the Euler–Mascheroni constant, and has simple poles at 0, −1, −2, −3, ... because exactly one denominator in the infinite product vanishes when z = 0, or a negative integer. (Note: The infinite product for Γ(z) is uniformly convergent on any bounded region where none of its denominators vanish; therefore it defines a meromorphic function on the complex plane.) Since all its poles lie on the negative real axis, from z = 0 to the point at infinity, this function might be described as "holomorphic on the cut plane, the cut extending along the negative real axis, from 0 (inclusive) to the point at infinity."

Alternatively, Γ(z) might be described as "holomorphic in the cut plane with −π < arg(z) < π and excluding the point z = 0."

This cut is slightly different from the 'branch cut' we've already encountered, because it actually excludes the negative real axis from the cut plane. The branch cut left the real axis connected with the cut plane on one side (0 ≤ θ), but severed it from the cut plane along the other side (θ < 2π).

Of course, it's not actually necessary to exclude the entire line segment from z = 0 to −∞ to construct a domain in which Γ(z) is holomorphic. All we really have to do is puncture the plane at a countably infinite set of points {0, −1, −2, −3, ...}. But a closed contour in the punctured plane might encircle one or more of the poles of Γ(z), giving a contour integral that is not necessarily zero, by the residue theorem. Cutting the complex plane ensures not only that Γ(z) is holomorphic in this restricted domain – but also that the contour integral of the gamma function over any closed curve lying in the cut plane is identically equal to zero.

=== Specifying convergence regions ===
Many complex functions are defined by infinite series, or by continued fractions. A fundamental consideration in the analysis of these infinitely long expressions is identifying the portion of the complex plane in which they converge to a finite value. A cut in the plane may facilitate this process, as the following examples show.

Consider the function defined by the infinite series

$$f(z) = \sum_{n=1}^\infty \left(z^2 + n\right)^{-2}.$$

Because z^{2} = (−z)^{2} for every complex number z, it's clear that f(z) is an even function of z, so the analysis can be restricted to one half of the complex plane. And since the series is undefined when

$$z^2 + n = 0 \quad \iff \quad z = \pm i\sqrt{n},$$

it makes sense to cut the plane along the entire imaginary axis and establish the convergence of this series where the real part of z is not zero before undertaking the more arduous task of examining f(z) when z is a pure imaginary number. (Note: When Re(z) > 0 this sum converges uniformly on any bounded domain by comparison with ζ(2), where ζ(s) is the Riemann zeta function.)

In this example the cut is a mere convenience, because the points at which the infinite sum is undefined are isolated, and the cut plane can be replaced with a suitably punctured plane. In some contexts the cut is necessary, and not just convenient. Consider the infinite periodic continued fraction

$$f(z) = 1 + \cfrac{z}{1 + \cfrac{z}{1 + \cfrac{z}{1 + \cfrac{z}{\ddots}}}}.$$

It can be shown that f(z) converges to a finite value if z is not a negative real number such that z < −1/4. In other words, the convergence region for this continued fraction is the cut plane, where the cut runs along the negative real axis, from −1/4 to the point at infinity.

== Gluing the cut plane back together ==
We have already seen how the relationship

$$w = f(z) = \pm\sqrt{z} = z^{1/2}$$

can be made into a single-valued function by splitting the domain of f into two disconnected sheets. It is also possible to "glue" those two sheets back together to form a single Riemann surface on which f(z) = z^{1/2} can be defined as a holomorphic function whose image is the entire w-plane (except for the point w = 0). Here's how that works.

Imagine two copies of the cut complex plane, the cuts extending along the positive real axis from z = 0 to the point at infinity. On one sheet define 0 ≤ arg(z) < 2π, so that 1^{1/2} = e^{0} = 1, by definition. On the second sheet define 2π ≤ arg(z) < 4π, so that 1^{1/2} = e^{iπ} = −1, again by definition. Now flip the second sheet upside down, so the imaginary axis points in the opposite direction of the imaginary axis on the first sheet, with both real axes pointing in the same direction, and "glue" the two sheets together (so that the edge on the first sheet labeled "θ = 0" is connected to the edge labeled "θ < 4π" on the second sheet, and the edge on the second sheet labeled "θ = 2π" is connected to the edge labeled "θ < 2π" on the first sheet). The result is the Riemann surface domain on which f(z) = z^{1/2} is single-valued and holomorphic (except when z = 0).

To understand why f is single-valued in this domain, imagine a circuit around the unit circle, starting with z = 1 on the first sheet. When 0 ≤ θ < 2π we are still on the first sheet. When θ = 2π we have crossed over onto the second sheet, and are obliged to make a second complete circuit around the branch point z = 0 before returning to our starting point, where θ = 4π is equivalent to θ = 0, because of the way we glued the two sheets together. In other words, as the variable z makes two complete turns around the branch point, the image of z in the w-plane traces out just one complete circle.

Formal differentiation shows that

$$f(z) = z^{1/2} \quad\Rightarrow\quad f' (z) = \tfrac{1}{2} z^{-1/2}$$

from which we can conclude that the derivative of f exists and is finite everywhere on the Riemann surface, except when z = 0 (that is, f is holomorphic, except when z = 0).

How can the Riemann surface for the function

$$w = g(z) = \left(z^2 - 1\right)^{1/2},$$

also discussed above, be constructed? Once again we begin with two copies of the z-plane, but this time each one is cut along the real line segment extending from z = −1 to z = 1 – these are the two branch points of g(z). We flip one of these upside down, so the two imaginary axes point in opposite directions, and glue the corresponding edges of the two cut sheets together. We can verify that g is a single-valued function on this surface by tracing a circuit around a circle of unit radius centered at z = 1. Commencing at the point z = 2 on the first sheet we turn halfway around the circle before encountering the cut at z = 0. The cut forces us onto the second sheet, so that when z has traced out one full turn around the branch point z = 1, w has taken just one-half of a full turn, the sign of w has been reversed (because e^{iπ} = −1), and our path has taken us to the point z = 2 on the second sheet of the surface. Continuing on through another half turn we encounter the other side of the cut, where z = 0, and finally reach our starting point (z = 2 on the first sheet) after making two full turns around the branch point.

The natural way to label θ = arg(z) in this example is to set −π < θ ≤ π on the first sheet, with π < θ ≤ 3π on the second. The imaginary axes on the two sheets point in opposite directions so that the counterclockwise sense of positive rotation is preserved as a closed contour moves from one sheet to the other (remember, the second sheet is upside down). Imagine this surface embedded in a three-dimensional space, with both sheets parallel to the xy-plane. Then there appears to be a vertical hole in the surface, where the two cuts are joined. What if the cut is made from z = −1 down the real axis to the point at infinity, and from z = 1, up the real axis until the cut meets itself? Again a Riemann surface can be constructed, but this time the "hole" is horizontal. Topologically speaking, both versions of this Riemann surface are equivalent – they are orientable two-dimensional surfaces of genus one.

== Use in control theory ==
In control theory, one use of the complex plane is known as the s-plane. It is used to visualise the roots of the equation describing a system's behaviour (the characteristic equation) graphically. The equation is normally expressed as a polynomial in the parameter s of the Laplace transform, hence the name s-plane. Points in the s-plane take the form s = σ + jω, where 'j' is used instead of the usual 'i' to represent the imaginary component (the variable 'i' is often used to denote electrical current in engineering contexts).

Another related use of the complex plane is with the Nyquist stability criterion. This is a geometric principle which allows the stability of a closed-loop feedback system to be determined by inspecting a Nyquist plot of its open-loop magnitude and phase response as a function of frequency (or loop transfer function) in the complex plane.

The z-plane is a discrete-time version of the s-plane, where z-transforms are used instead of the Laplace transformation.

== Quadratic algebras ==
The complex plane is associated with two distinct quadratic spaces. For a point z = x + iy in the complex plane, the squaring function z^{2} and the norm-squared x^{2} + y^{2} are both quadratic forms. The former is frequently neglected in the wake of the latter's use in setting a metric on the complex plane. The complex plane of this article is the quotient ring $\R[X]/(X^2 + 1)$ where the ideal is the quadratic polynomial associated with the imaginary unit. There are two other ideals that yield quotient rings that are two-dimensional real algebras, and hence “complex planes”. These are the quadratic algebras over the real number field.

== See also ==
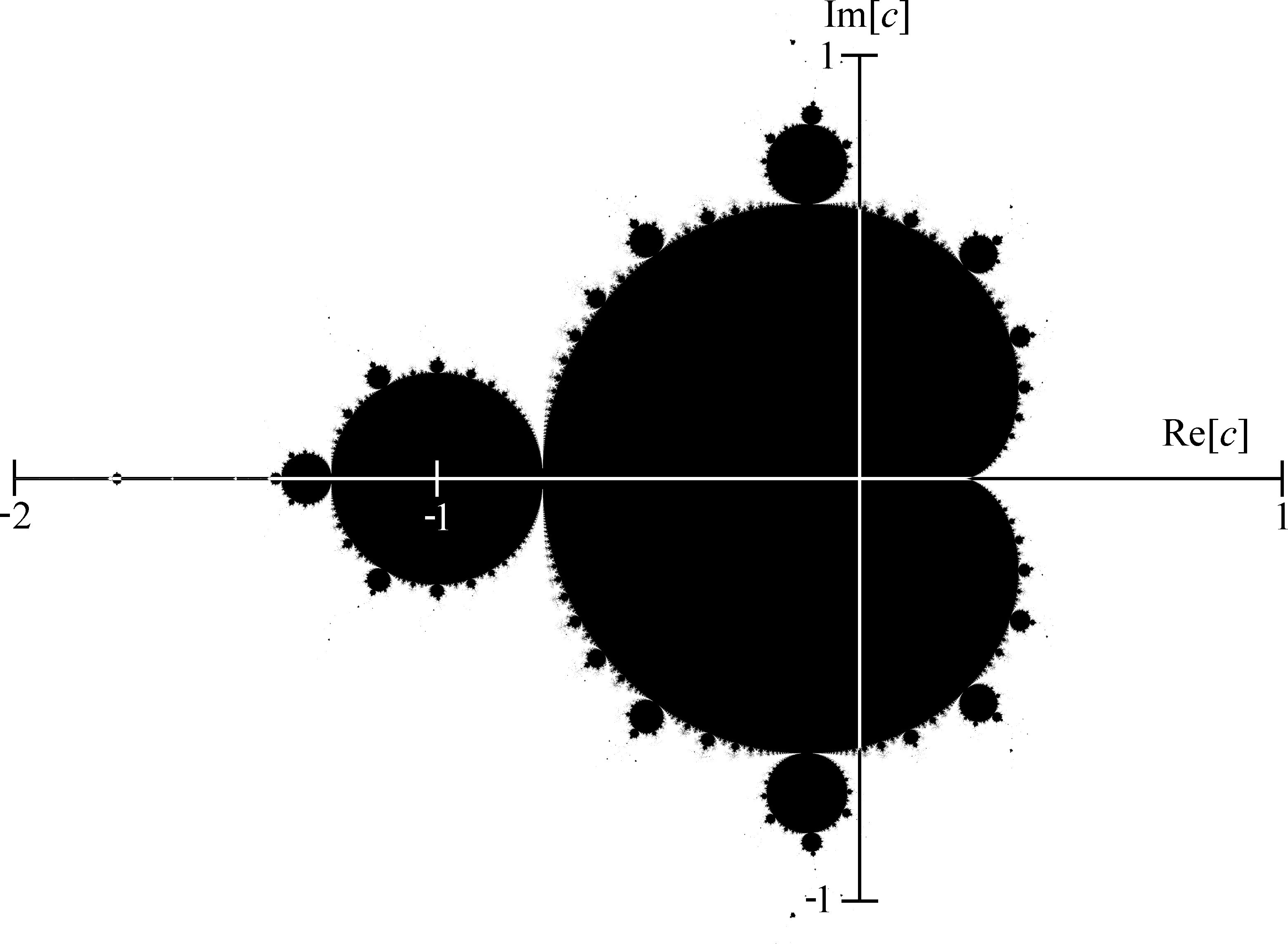
Mandelbrot fractal, imaged on a complex plane

- Complex coordinate space
- Complex geometry
- Complex line
- Constellation diagram
- Riemann sphere, which is an extended complex plane
- s-plane
- In-phase and quadrature components
- Real line
