= Three-term recurrence relation =

In mathematics, and especially in numerical analysis, a homogeneous linear three-term recurrence relation (TTRR, the qualifiers "homogeneous linear" are usually taken for granted) is a recurrence relation of the form

$y_{n+1}=a_n y_n + b_n y_{n-1}$ for $n=1,2,...,$

where the sequences $\{a_n\}$ and $\{b_n\}$, together with the initial values $y_0, y_1$ govern the evolution of the sequence $\{y_n\}$.

== Applications ==
If the $\{a_n\}$ and $\{b_n\}$ are constant and independent of the step index n, then the TTRR is a Linear recurrence with constant coefficients of order 2. Arguably the simplest, and most prominent, example for this case is the Fibonacci sequence, which has constant coefficients $a_n=b_n=1$.

Orthogonal polynomials P_{n} all have a TTRR with respect to degree n,

$$P_n(x) = (A_n x + B_n) P_{n-1}(x) + C_n P_{n-2}(x)$$

where A_{n} is not 0. Conversely, Favard's theorem states that a sequence of polynomials satisfying a TTRR is a sequence of orthogonal polynomials.

Also many other special functions have TTRRs. For example, the solution to

$$J_{n+1}=\frac{2n}{z}J_n-J_{n-1}$$

is given by the Bessel function $J_n=J_n(z)$. TTRRs are an important tool for the numeric computation of special functions.

TTRRs are closely related to continued fractions.

== Solution ==
Solutions of a TTRR, like those of a linear ordinary differential equation, form a two-dimensional vector space: any solution can be written as the linear combination of any two linear independent solutions. A unique solution is specified through the initial values $y_0, y_1$.

== See also ==
- Miller's recurrence algorithm

== Literature ==
- Walter Gautschi. Computational Aspects of Three-Term Recurrence Relations. SIAM Review, 9:24–80 (1967).
- Walter Gautschi. Minimal Solutions of Three-Term Recurrence Relation and Orthogonal Polynomials. Mathematics of Computation, 36:547–554 (1981).
- Amparo Gil, Javier Segura, and Nico M. Temme. Numerical Methods for Special Functions. siam (2007)
- J. Wimp, Computation with recurrence relations, London: Pitman (1984)
