= Convergence problem =

In the analytic theory of continued fractions, the convergence problem is the determination of conditions on the partial numerators a_{i} and partial denominators b_{i} that are sufficient to guarantee the convergence of the infinite continued fraction

$$x = b_0 + \cfrac{a_1}{b_1 + \cfrac{a_2}{b_2 + \cfrac{a_3}{b_3 + \cfrac{a_4}{b_4 + \ddots}}}}.\,$$

This convergence problem is inherently more difficult than the corresponding problem for infinite series.

== Elementary results ==
When the elements of an infinite continued fraction consist entirely of positive real numbers, the determinant formula can easily be applied to demonstrate when the continued fraction converges. Since the denominators B_{n} cannot be zero in this simple case, the problem boils down to showing that the product of successive denominators B_{n}B_{n+1} grows more quickly than the product of the partial numerators a_{1}a_{2}a_{3}...a_{n+1}. The convergence problem is much more difficult when the elements of the continued fraction are complex numbers.

=== Periodic continued fractions ===
An infinite periodic continued fraction is a continued fraction of the form

$$x = \cfrac{a_1}{b_1 + \cfrac{a_2}{b_2 + \cfrac{\ddots}{\quad\ddots\quad b_{k-1} + \cfrac{a_k}{b_k + \cfrac{a_1}{b_1 + \cfrac{a_2}{b_2 + \ddots}}}}}}\,$$

where k ≥ 1, the sequence of partial numerators {a_{1}, a_{2}, a_{3}, ..., a_{k}} contains no values equal to zero, and the partial numerators {a_{1}, a_{2}, a_{3}, ..., a_{k}} and partial denominators {b_{1}, b_{2}, b_{3}, ..., b_{k}} repeat over and over again, ad infinitum.

By applying the theory of linear fractional transformations to

$$s(w) = \frac{A_{k-1}w + A_k}{B_{k-1}w + B_k}\,$$

where A_{k-1}, B_{k-1}, A_{k}, and B_{k} are the numerators and denominators of the k-1st and kth convergents of the infinite periodic continued fraction x, it can be shown that x converges to one of the fixed points of s(w) if it converges at all. Specifically, let r_{1} and r_{2} be the roots of the quadratic equation

$$B_{k-1}w^2 + (B_k - A_{k-1})w - A_k = 0.\,$$

These roots are the fixed points of s(w). If r_{1} and r_{2} are finite then the infinite periodic continued fraction x converges if and only if

1. the two roots are equal; or
2. the k-1st convergent is closer to r_{1} than it is to r_{2}, and none of the first k convergents equal r_{2}.

If the denominator B_{k-1} is equal to zero then an infinite number of the denominators B_{nk-1} also vanish, and the continued fraction does not converge to a finite value. And when the two roots r_{1} and r_{2} are equidistant from the k-1st convergent – or when r_{1} is closer to the k-1st convergent than r_{2} is, but one of the first k convergents equals r_{2} – the continued fraction x diverges by oscillation.

=== The special case when period k = 1 ===
If the period of a continued fraction is 1; that is, if

$$x = \underset{1}{\overset{\infty}{\mathrm K}} \frac{a}{b},\,$$

where b ≠ 0, we can obtain a very strong result. First, by applying an equivalence transformation we see that x converges if and only if

$$y = 1 + \underset{1}{\overset{\infty}{\mathrm K}} \frac{z}{1}\qquad \left(z = \frac{a}{b^2}\right)\,$$

converges. Then, by applying the more general result obtained above it can be shown that

$$y = 1 + \cfrac{z}{1 + \cfrac{z}{1 + \cfrac{z}{1 + \ddots}}}\,$$

converges for every complex number z except when z is a negative real number and z < −1/4. Moreover, this continued fraction y converges to the particular value of

$$y = \frac{1}{2}\left(1 \pm \sqrt{4z + 1}\right)\,$$

that has the larger absolute value (except when z is real and z < −1/4, in which case the two fixed points of the LFT generating y have equal moduli and y diverges by oscillation).

By applying another equivalence transformation the condition that guarantees convergence of

$$x = \underset{1}{\overset{\infty}{\mathrm K}} \frac{1}{z} = \cfrac{1}{z + \cfrac{1}{z + \cfrac{1}{z + \ddots}}}\,$$

can also be determined. Since a simple equivalence transformation shows that

$$x = \cfrac{z^{-1}}{1 + \cfrac{z^{-2}}{1 + \cfrac{z^{-2}}{1 + \ddots}}}\,$$

whenever z ≠ 0, the preceding result for the continued fraction y can be restated for x. The infinite periodic continued fraction

$$x = \underset{1}{\overset{\infty}{\mathrm K}} \frac{1}{z}$$

converges if and only if z^{2} is not a real number lying in the interval −4 < z^{2} ≤ 0 – or, equivalently, x converges if and only if z ≠ 0 and z is not a pure imaginary number with imaginary part between -2 and 2. (Not including either endpoint)

=== Worpitzky's theorem ===
By applying the fundamental inequalities to the continued fraction

$$x = \cfrac{1}{1 + \cfrac{a_2}{1 + \cfrac{a_3}{1 + \cfrac{a_4}{1 + \ddots}}}}\,$$

it can be shown that the following statements hold if |a_{i}| ≤ 1/4 for the partial numerators a_{i}, i = 2, 3, 4, ...

- The continued fraction x converges to a finite value, and converges uniformly if the partial numerators a_{i} are complex variables.
- The value of x and of each of its convergents x_{i} lies in the circular domain of radius 2/3 centered on the point z = 4/3; that is, in the region defined by

$\Omega = \lbrace z: |z - 4/3| \leq 2/3 \rbrace.\,$

- The radius 1/4 is the largest radius over which x can be shown to converge without exception, and the region Ω is the smallest image space that contains all possible values of the continued fraction x.

Because the proof of Worpitzky's theorem employs Euler's continued fraction formula to construct an infinite series that is equivalent to the continued fraction x, and the series so constructed is absolutely convergent, the Weierstrass M-test can be applied to a modified version of x. If

$$f(z) = \cfrac{1}{1 + \cfrac{c_2z}{1 + \cfrac{c_3z}{1 + \cfrac{c_4z}{1 + \ddots}}}}\,$$

and a positive real number M exists such that |c_{i}| ≤ M (i = 2, 3, 4, ...), then the sequence of convergents {f_{i}(z)} converges uniformly when

$$|z| < \frac{1}{4M}\,$$

and f(z) is analytic on that open disk.

== Śleszyński–Pringsheim criterion ==
In the late 19th century, Śleszyński and later Pringsheim showed that a continued fraction, in which the as and bs may be complex numbers, will converge to a finite value if $|b_n | \geq |a_n| + 1$ for $n \geq 1.$

== Van Vleck's theorem ==
Jones and Thron attribute the following result to Van Vleck. Suppose that all the a_{i} are equal to 1, and all the b_{i} have arguments with:

$$- \pi /2 + \epsilon < \arg ( b_i)  < \pi / 2 - \epsilon, i \geq 1,$$

with epsilon being any positive number less than $\pi/2$. In other words, all the b_{i} are inside a wedge which has its vertex at the origin, has an opening angle of $\pi - 2 \epsilon$, and is symmetric around the positive real axis. Then f_{i}, the ith convergent to the continued fraction, is finite and has an argument:

$$- \pi /2 + \epsilon  <  \arg ( f_i ) <  \pi / 2 - \epsilon,  i \geq 1.$$

Also, the sequence of even convergents will converge, as will the sequence of odd convergents. The continued fraction itself will converge if and only if the sum of all the |b_{i}| diverges.
