= Square root of 7 =

Positive real number which when multiplied by itself gives 7

- Rationality: Irrational

Representations
- Decimal: 2.645751311064590590...
- Algebraic form: $\sqrt{7}$
- Continued fraction: [2;1,1,1,4,1,1,1,4...]

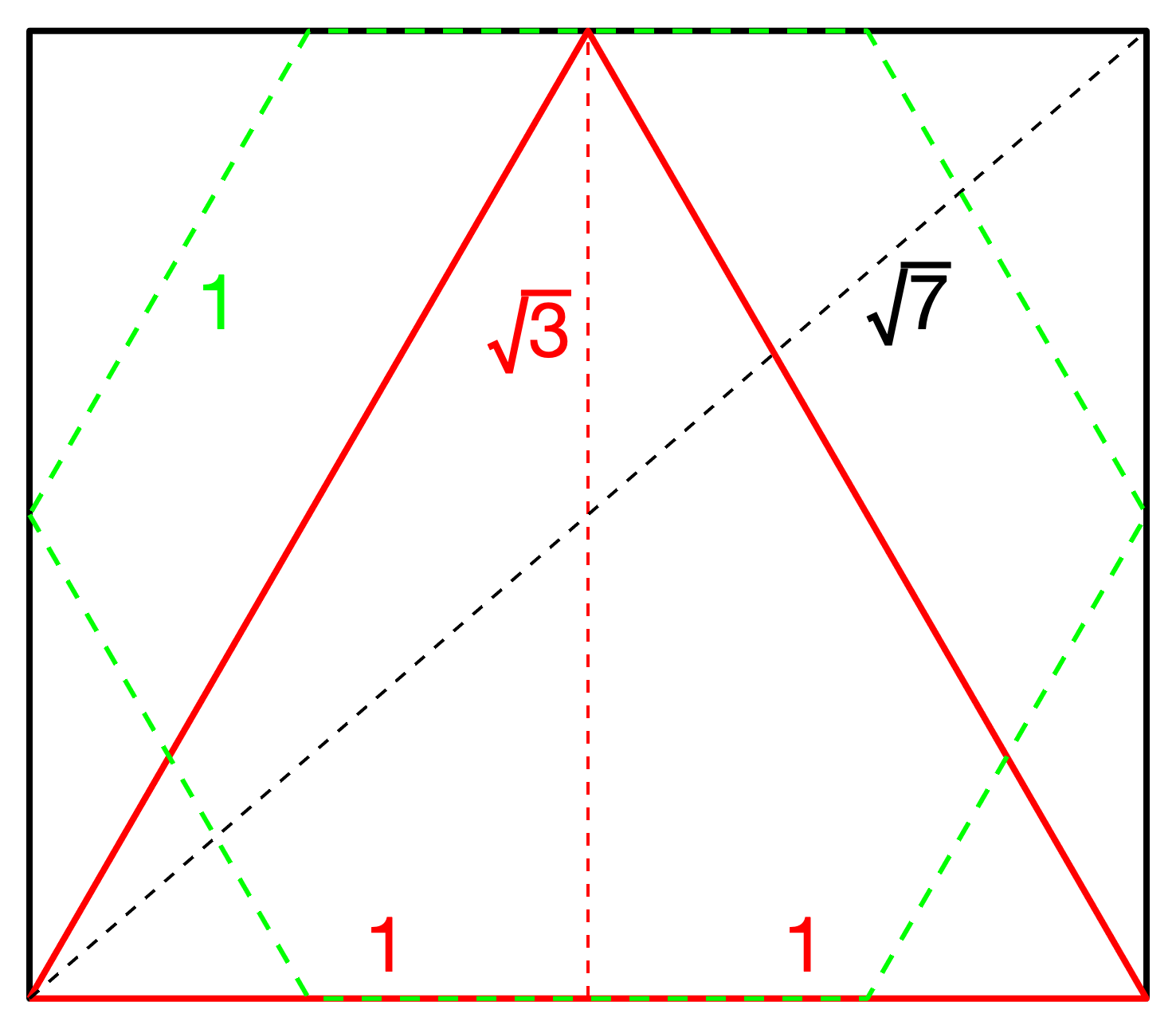
The rectangle that bounds an equilateral triangle of side 2, or a regular hexagon of side 1, has size square root of 3 by square root of 4, with a diagonal of square root of 7.

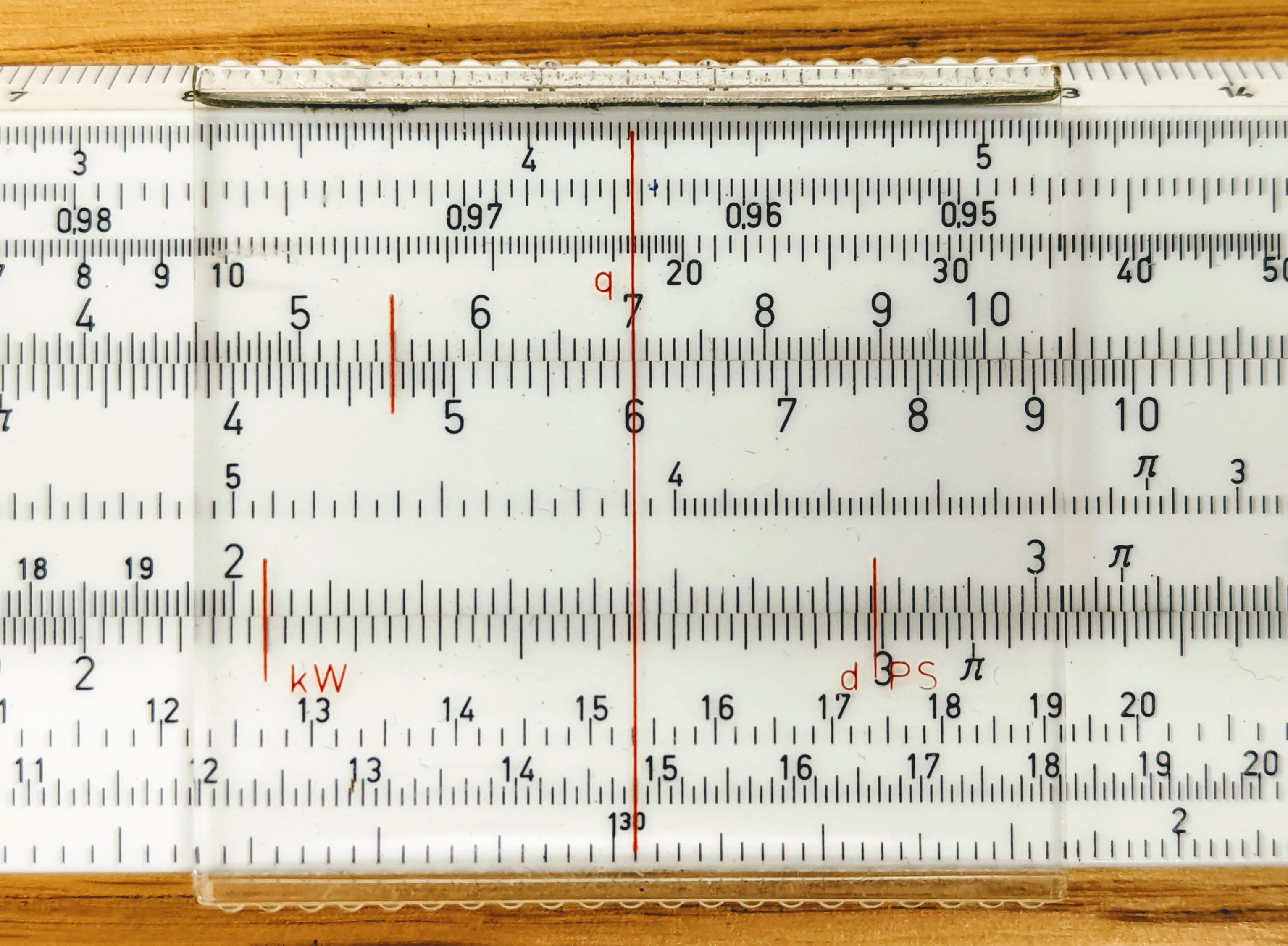
A Logarex system Darmstadt slide rule with 7 and 6 on A and B scales, and square roots of 6 and of 7 on C and D scales, which can be read as slightly less than 2.45 and somewhat more than 2.64, respectively

The square root of 7 is the positive real number that, when multiplied by itself, gives the prime number 7.

It is an irrational algebraic number. The first thirty significant digits of its decimal expansion are:

2.64575131106459059050161575364....

More than a million decimal digits of the square root of seven have been published.

== Rational approximations ==
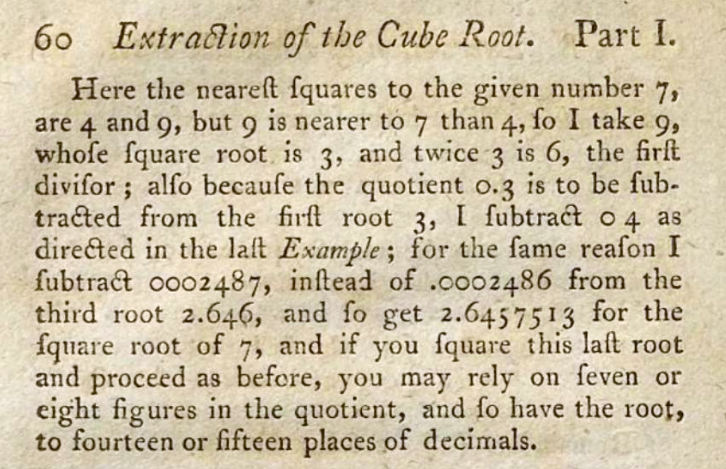
Explanation of how to extract the square root of 7 to 7 places and more, from Hawney, 1797

The extraction of decimal-fraction approximations to square roots by various methods has used the square root of 7 as an example or exercise in textbooks, for hundreds of years. Different numbers of digits after the decimal point are shown: 5 in 1773 and 1852, 3 in 1835, 6 in 1808, and 7 in 1797. An extraction by Newton's method (approximately) was illustrated in 1922, concluding that it is 2.646 "to the nearest thousandth".

== Geometry ==
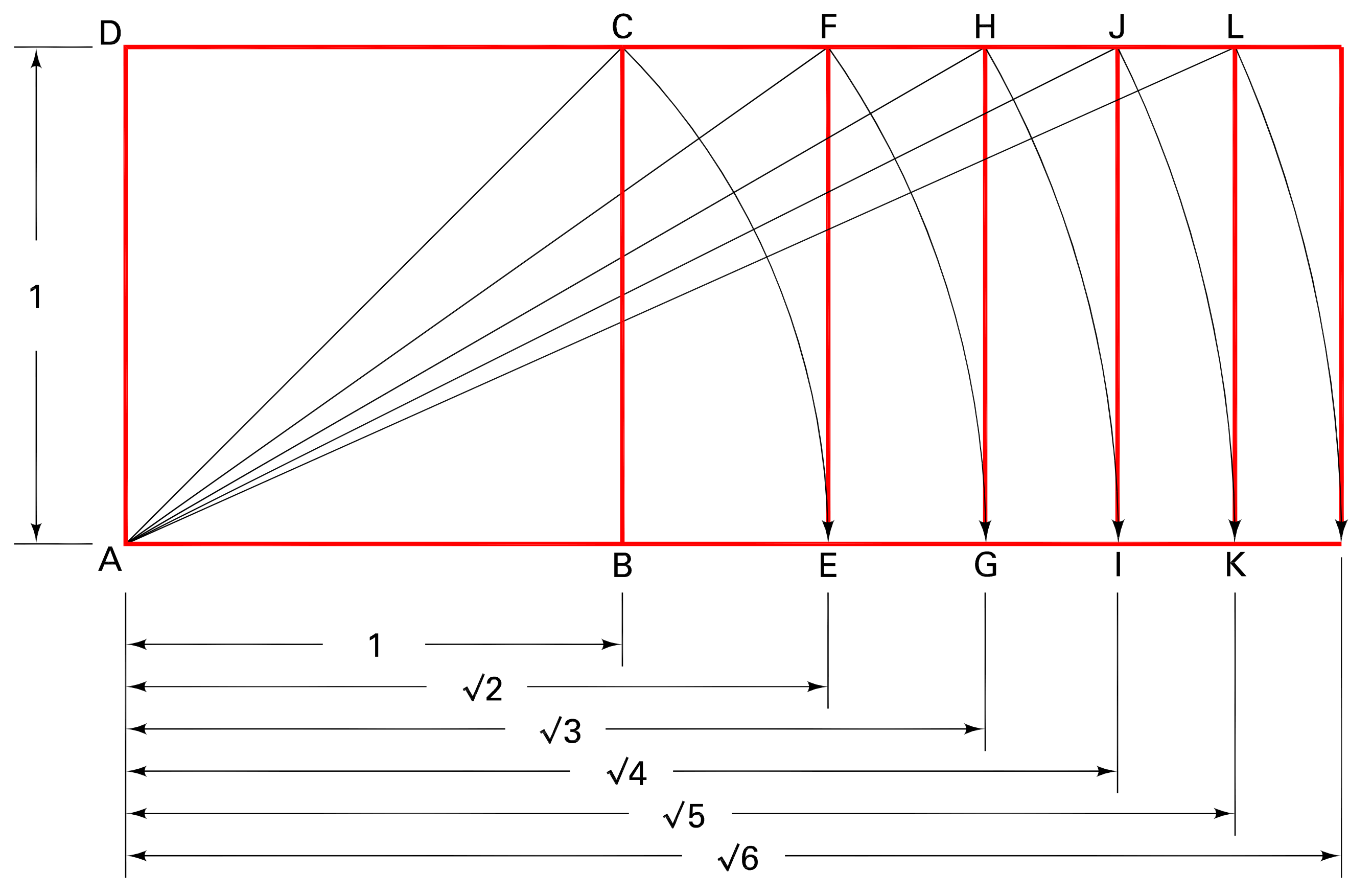
Root rectangles illustrate a construction of the square root of 7 (the diagonal of the root-6 rectangle).

In plane geometry, the square root of 7 can be constructed via a sequence of dynamic rectangles, that is, as the largest diagonal of those rectangles illustrated here.

The minimal enclosing rectangle of an equilateral triangle of edge length 2 has a diagonal of the square root of 7.

Due to the Pythagorean theorem and Legendre's three-square theorem, $\sqrt{7}$ is the smallest square root of a natural number that cannot be the distance between any two points of a cubic integer lattice (or equivalently, the length of the space diagonal of a rectangular cuboid with integer side lengths). $\sqrt{15}$ is the next smallest such number.

== See also ==
- Square root
- Square root of 2
- Square root of 3
- Square root of 5
- Square root of 6
- Square root of 8
