= Square root of 5 =

Positive real number which when multiplied by itself gives 5

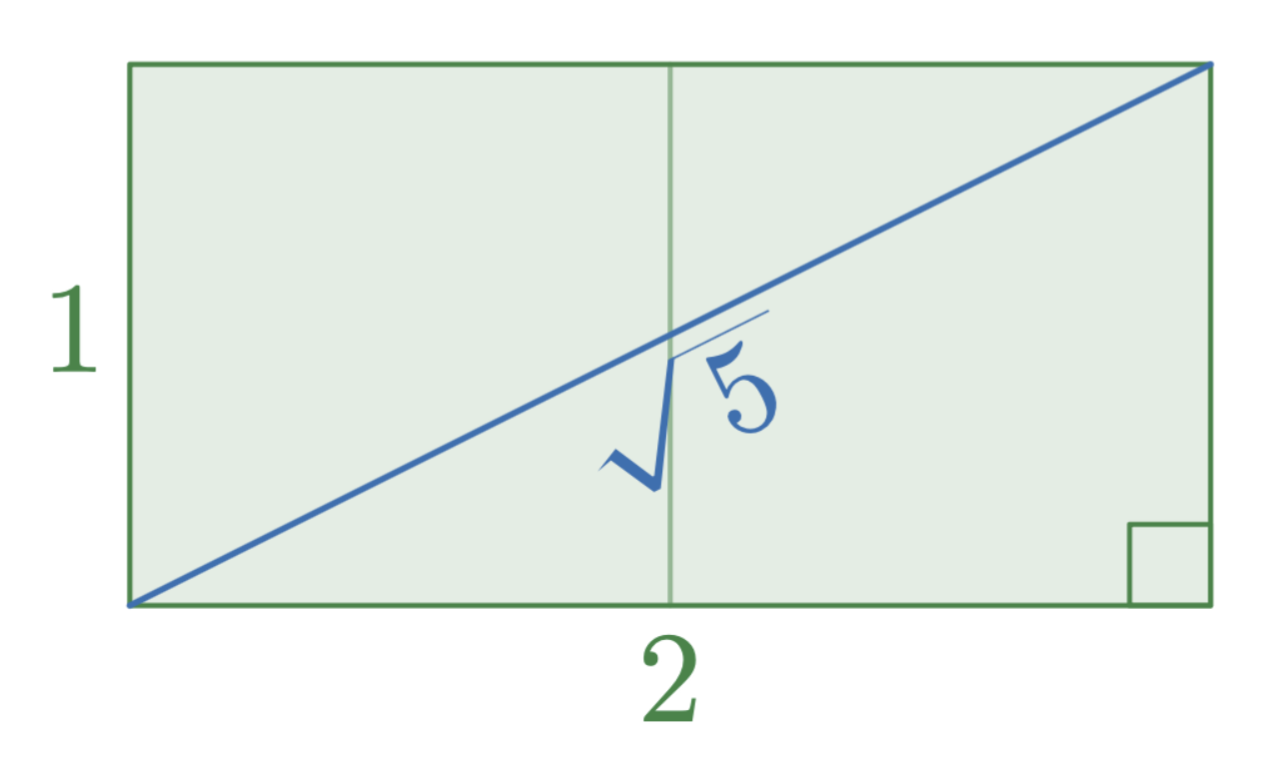
- The diagonal of a 2 × 1 rectangle has length √5.
- Rationality: Irrational

Representations
- Decimal: 2.23606797749978969...
- Algebraic form: $\sqrt{5}$
- Continued fraction: $2 + \cfrac{1}{4 + \cfrac{1}{4 + \cfrac{1}{4 + {{\vphantom x} \atop \displaystyle\ddots} }}}$

The square root of 5, denoted $\sqrt5$, is the positive real number that, when multiplied by itself, gives the natural number 5. Along with its conjugate $-\sqrt5$, it solves the quadratic equation $x^2 - 5 = 0$, making it a quadratic integer, a type of algebraic number. $\sqrt5$ is an irrational number, meaning it cannot be written as a fraction of integers. The first thirty significant digits of its decimal expansion are:

2.23606797749978969640917366873...

A length of $\sqrt5$ can be constructed as the diagonal of a $2 \times 1$ unit rectangle. $\sqrt5$ also appears throughout in the metrical geometry of shapes with fivefold symmetry; the ratio between diagonal and side of a regular pentagon is the golden ratio $\varphi = \tfrac12\bigl(1 + \sqrt5~\!\bigr)$.

== Rational approximations ==
The square root of 5 is an irrational number, meaning it can not be exactly represented as a fraction $x/y$ where $x$ and $y$ are integers. However, it can be approximated arbitrarily closely by such rational numbers.

Particularly good approximations are the integer solutions of Pell's equations,

$$x^2 - 5y^2 = 1 \quad \text{and} \quad x^2 - 5y^2 = -1,$$

which can be algebraically rearranged into the form

$$\frac{x}{y} = \sqrt{5 \pm \frac{1}{y^2}} .$$

For example, the approximation $\textstyle 2 = \sqrt{5 - 1 }$, which is accurate to about 10%, satisfies the negative Pell's equation, $\textstyle 2^2 - 5\cdot 1^2 = 4 - 5 = -1$; likewise, the approximation $\textstyle \tfrac94 = \sqrt{5 + \tfrac{1}{16} } = 2.25$, which is accurate within 1%, satisfies the positive equation, $\textstyle 9^2 - 5\cdot 4^2 = 81 - 80 = 1$. These two approximations are the respective fundamental solutions of each Pell's equation, to which additional solutions are algebraically related.

Solutions to both Pell's equations can also be found systematically by following the Euclidean algorithm, resulting in the simple continued fraction for $\sqrt5$,

$$\sqrt5 = [2; 4, 4, 4, \ldots{}] = 2 + \cfrac 1 {4 + \cfrac 1 {4 + \cfrac 1 {4 + {{\vphantom x} \atop \displaystyle\ddots}}}}.$$

Each step $n$ of the algorithm produces a better approximation $x_n / y_n$, one of the convergents (partial evaluations) of this continued fraction. These are a sequence of best rational approximations to $\sqrt5$, each more accurate than any other rational approximation with the same or smaller denominator. They give all of the solutions to Pell's equations, satisfying $\textstyle x_n^2 - 5y_n^2 = (-1)^n$. The first several convergents to the continued fraction are:

$\boldsymbol n$	$0$	$1$	$2$	$3$	$4$	$5$	$6$	$7$	$8$	$9$	$\ldots$
$\frac{\boldsymbol{x_n}\vphantom{t} }{\boldsymbol {y_n} }$	$\frac{1}{0}$	$\frac{2}{1}$	$\frac{9}{4}$	$\frac{38}{17}$	$\frac{161}{72}$	$\frac{682}{305}$	$\frac{2889}{1292}$	$\frac{12238}{5473}$	$\frac{51841}{23184}$	$\frac{219602}{98209}$	$\ldots$

In the limit, these approximations converge to $\sqrt5$. That is, $\textstyle \lim_{n\to\infty} x_n/y_n = \sqrt5$.

One of the oldest methods of calculating a square root of a number $d$, the Babylonian method, starts with an initial guess $x_0$, and at each step finds a new approximation by averaging the previous approximation and $d$ times its reciprocal, $x_{n+1} = \tfrac12(x_n + d/x_n)$. This is the special case, for the function $\textstyle f(x) = x^2 - d$, of Newton's method for finding the root of an arbitrary function. For a typical guess, the approximation converges quadratically (roughly doubles the number of correct digits at each step).

The initial guess is somewhat arbitrary, but when approximating $\sqrt5$ by this method, usually $x_0 = 2$ is chosen. With this choice, the $n$th approximation is equal to the $2^n$th convergent of the continued fraction for $\sqrt5$.

$$\begin{align}
x_0 &= \frac{2}{1} & \!\!x_1 &= \frac{9}{4} & \!\!x_2 & = \frac{161}{72} & \!\!x_3 &= \frac{51841}{23184} \\[3mu]
&=2.{\color{BrickRed} 0}, & &=2.2{\color{BrickRed} 5}, & &\approx 2.236{\color{BrickRed} 1}, & &\approx 2.23606\,7977{\color{BrickRed} 9}, & \!\! \ldots,
\end{align}$$

with digits that differ from the decimal expansion of $\sqrt5$ highlighted in red.

== Relation to the golden ratio and Fibonacci numbers ==
The 1/2√5 diagonal of a half square forms the basis for the geometrical construction of a golden rectangle.

The golden ratio $\varphi$ is the arithmetic mean of 1 and $\sqrt{5}$. $\sqrt{5}$ has a relationship to the golden ratio and its algebraic conjugate $\overline\varphi$ as is expressed in the following formulae:

$$\begin{align}
\sqrt{5} &= \varphi - \overline\varphi = 2\varphi - 1 = 1 - 2\overline\varphi, \\[5pt]
\varphi &= \frac{1 + \sqrt{5}}{2} = \overline\varphi + \sqrt5 = - \frac{1}{~\!\overline\varphi\!~} = 1 - \overline\varphi, \\[5pt]
\overline\varphi &= \frac{1 - \sqrt{5}}{2} = \varphi - \sqrt5 = - \frac{1}{\varphi} = 1 - \varphi.
\end{align}$$
$\sqrt{5}$ then figures in the closed form expression for the Fibonacci numbers:

$$F(n) = \frac{\varphi^n-\overline\varphi^n}{\sqrt 5}.$$

The quotient $\sqrt{5}\big/\varphi$ provides an interesting pattern of continued fractions and are related to the ratios between the Fibonacci numbers and the Lucas numbers:

$$\begin{align}
\frac{\sqrt{5}}{\varphi} = \frac{5 - \sqrt{5}}{2} & = 1.381966\dots = [1; 2, 1, 1, 1, \ldots]
\end{align}$$

The convergents feature the Lucas numbers as numerators and the Fibonacci numbers as denominators:

$$\frac{1}{1}, \frac{3}{2}, \frac{4}{3}, \frac{7}{5}, \frac{11}{8}, \frac{18}{13}, \frac{29}{21}, \ldots, \frac{L_{n}}{F_{n+1}}, \ldots$$

In the limit,
$$\lim_{n\to\infty} \frac{F_{n+1}}{F_n} = \frac{L_{n+1}}{L_n} = \varphi, \qquad
\lim_{n\to\infty} \frac{L_n}{F_n} = \sqrt{5}.$$

More precisely, the convergents to the continued fraction for $\sqrt5$ (see § Rational approximations above) are:

$$\frac{2}{1}, \frac{9}{4}, \frac{38}{17}, \frac{161}{72}, \frac{682}{305}, \ldots, \frac{\tfrac12L_{3n}}{\tfrac12F_{3n}}, \ldots.$$

== Geometry ==
Decomposition of a 1 × 2 right triangle into five similar triangles, the basis for the aperiodic pinwheel tiling

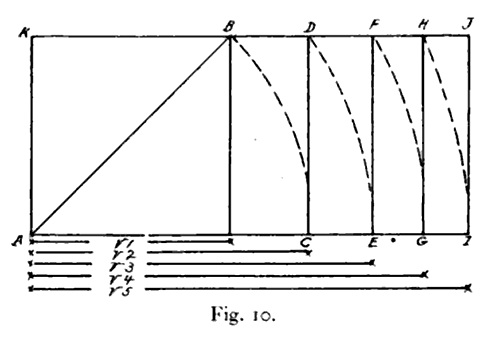
Jay Hambidge's construction of "root rectangles"

Distances between vertices of a double unit cube are square roots of the first six natural numbers. (√7 is not possible due to Legendre's three-square theorem.)

Geometrically, $\sqrt{5}$ corresponds to the diagonal of a rectangle whose sides are of length 1 and 2, as is evident from the Pythagorean theorem. Such a rectangle can be obtained by halving a square, or by placing two equal squares side by side. This can be used to subdivide a square grid into a tilted square grid with five times as many squares, forming the basis for a subdivision surface. Together with the algebraic relationship between $\sqrt{5}$ and $\varphi$, this forms the basis for the geometrical construction of a golden rectangle from a square, and for the construction of a regular pentagon given its side (since the side-to-diagonal ratio in a regular pentagon is $\varphi$).

Since two adjacent faces of a cube would unfold into a $1\mathbin{:}2$ rectangle, the ratio between the length of the cube's edge and the shortest distance from one of its vertices to the opposite one, when traversing the cube surface, is $\sqrt{5}$. By contrast, the shortest distance when traversing through the inside of the cube corresponds to the length of the cube diagonal, which is the square root of three times the edge.

A rectangle with side proportions $1\mathbin{:}\sqrt{5}$ is part of the series of dynamic rectangles, which are based on proportions $\sqrt1$, $\sqrt2$, $\sqrt3$, $\sqrt4$, $\sqrt5$, ... and successively constructed using the diagonal of the previous root rectangle, starting from a square. A root-5 rectangle is particularly notable in that it can be split into a square and two equal golden rectangles or into two golden rectangles of different sizes. It can also be decomposed as the union of two equal golden rectangles whose intersection forms a square. These shapes pictorially represent the algebraic relationships between $\sqrt{5}$, $\varphi$ and $\varphi^{-1}$ mentioned above.

== Trigonometry ==
The square root of 5 appears in trigonometric constants related to the angles in a regular pentagon and decagon, which when combined which can be combined with other angles involving $\sqrt{2}$ and $\sqrt{3}$ to describe sines and cosines of every angle whose measure in degrees is divisible by 3 but not by 15. The simplest of these are

$$\begin{align}
\sin\frac{\pi}{10} = \sin 18^\circ &= \tfrac{1}{4}(\sqrt5-1) = \frac{1}{\sqrt5+1}, \\[5pt]
\sin\frac{\pi}{5} = \sin 36^\circ &= \tfrac{1}{4}\sqrt{2(5-\sqrt5)}, \\[5pt]
\sin\frac{3\pi}{10} = \sin 54^\circ &= \tfrac{1}{4}(\sqrt5+1) = \frac{1}{\sqrt5-1}, \\[5pt]
\sin\frac{2\pi}{5} = \sin 72^\circ &= \tfrac{1}{4}\sqrt{2(5+\sqrt5)}\, . \end{align}$$

Computing its value was therefore historically important for generating trigonometric tables. Since $\sqrt{5}$ is geometrically linked to half-square rectangles and to pentagons, it also appears frequently in formulae for the geometric properties of figures derived from them, such as in the formula for the volume of a dodecahedron.

== Diophantine approximations ==
Hurwitz's theorem in Diophantine approximations states that every irrational number x can be approximated by infinitely many rational numbers m/n in lowest terms in such a way that

$$\left|x - \frac{m}{n}\right| < \frac{1}{\sqrt{5}\,n^2}$$

and that $\sqrt{5}$ is best possible, in the sense that for any larger constant than $\sqrt{5}$, there are some irrational numbers x for which only finitely many such approximations exist.

Closely related to this is the theorem that of any three consecutive convergents p_{i}/q_{i}, (p_{i+1})/(q_{i+1}), (p_{i+2})/(q_{i+2}), of a number α, at least one of the three inequalities holds:

$$\left|\alpha - {p_i\over q_i}\right| < {1\over \sqrt5 q_i^2}, \quad
\left|\alpha - {p_{i+1}\over q_{i+1}}\right| < {1\over \sqrt5 q_{i+1}^2}, \quad
\left|\alpha - {p_{i+2}\over q_{i+2}}\right| < {1\over \sqrt5 q_{i+2}^2}.$$

And the $\sqrt{5}$ in the denominator is the best bound possible since the convergents of the golden ratio make the difference on the left-hand side arbitrarily close to the value on the right-hand side. In particular, one cannot obtain a tighter bound by considering sequences of four or more consecutive convergents.

Aleksandr Korkin and Yegor Ivanovich Zolotaryov proved in 1873 that the first two Lagrange numbers are the square root of 5 and the square root of 8, which later inspired the work of Andrey Markov on what became known as Markov's theorem.

== Algebra ==
The two quadratic fields $\Q\bigl(\sqrt{5}\bigr)$ and $\Q\bigl(\sqrt{-5}\bigr)$, field extensions of the rational numbers, and their associated rings of integers, $\Z\bigl[\tfrac12 + \tfrac12\sqrt5]$ and $\Z\bigl[{\sqrt{-5} }]$, respectively, are basic examples and have been studied extensively.

The ring $\mathbb{Z}[\sqrt{-5}]$ contains numbers of the form $a + b\sqrt{-5}$, where a and b are integers and $\sqrt{-5}$ is the imaginary number $i\sqrt{5}$. This ring is a frequently cited example of an integral domain that is not a unique factorization domain. For example, the number 6 has two inequivalent factorizations within this ring: $6 = 2 \cdot 3 = (1 - \sqrt{-5})(1 + \sqrt{-5}). \,$

On the other hand, the real quadratic integer ring of golden integers $\Z[\varphi]$, adjoining the golden ratio $\varphi = \tfrac12\bigl(1 + \sqrt{5}\bigr)$, was shown to be Euclidean, and hence a unique factorization domain, by Richard Dedekind. This is the ring of integers in the golden field $\Q\bigl(\sqrt{5}\bigr)$.

The field $\Q\bigl(\sqrt{-5}\bigr)$, like any other quadratic field, is an abelian extension of the rational numbers. The Kronecker–Weber theorem therefore guarantees that the square root of five can be written as a rational linear combination of roots of unity:

$$\sqrt5 = e^{2\pi i/5} - e^{4\pi i/5} - e^{6\pi i/5} + e^{8\pi i/5}. \,$$

== Decimal calculation ==
As of January 2022, the numerical value in decimal of the square root of 5 has been computed to at least 2.25 trillion digits.

== See also ==
- Golden ratio
- Square root
- Square root of 2
- Square root of 3
- Square root of 6
- Square root of 7
- Square root of 8
- Square root of 10
