= Square root of 6 =

Positive real number which when multiplied by itself gives 6

- Rationality: Irrational

Representations
- Decimal: 2.449489742783178098...
- Algebraic form: $\sqrt{6}$
- Continued fraction: $2 + \cfrac{1}{2 + \cfrac{1}{4 + \cfrac{1}{2 + \cfrac{1}{4 + \ddots}}}}$

Distances between vertices of a double unit cube are square roots of the first six natural numbers. (√7 is not possible due to Legendre's three-square theorem.)

The square root of 6 is the positive real number that, when multiplied by itself, gives the natural number 6. It is more precisely called the principal square root of 6, to distinguish it from the negative number with the same property. This number appears in numerous geometric and number-theoretic contexts.

It is an irrational algebraic number. The first thirty significant digits of its decimal expansion are:

2.44948974278317809819728407471....

which can be rounded up to 2.45 to within about 99.98% accuracy (about 1 part in 4800).

Since 6 is the product of 2 and 3, the square root of 6 is the geometric mean of 2 and 3, and is the product of the square root of 2 and the square root of 3, both of which are irrational algebraic numbers.

NASA has published more than a million decimal digits of the square root of six.

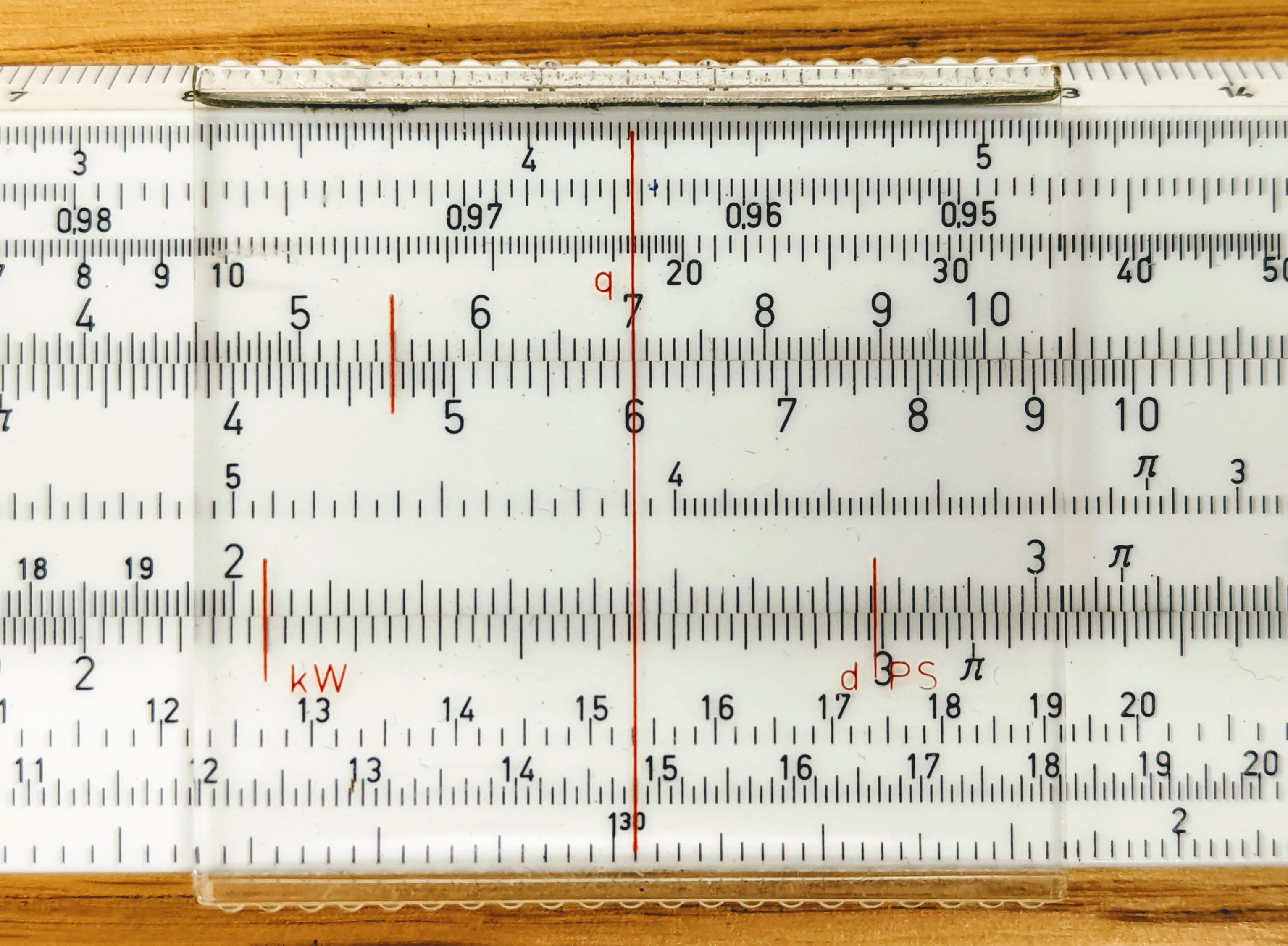
A Logarex system Darmstadt slide rule with 7 and 6 on A and B scales, and square roots of 6 and of 7 on C and D scales, which can be read as slightly less than 2.45 and somewhat more than 2.64, respectively

== Geometry ==
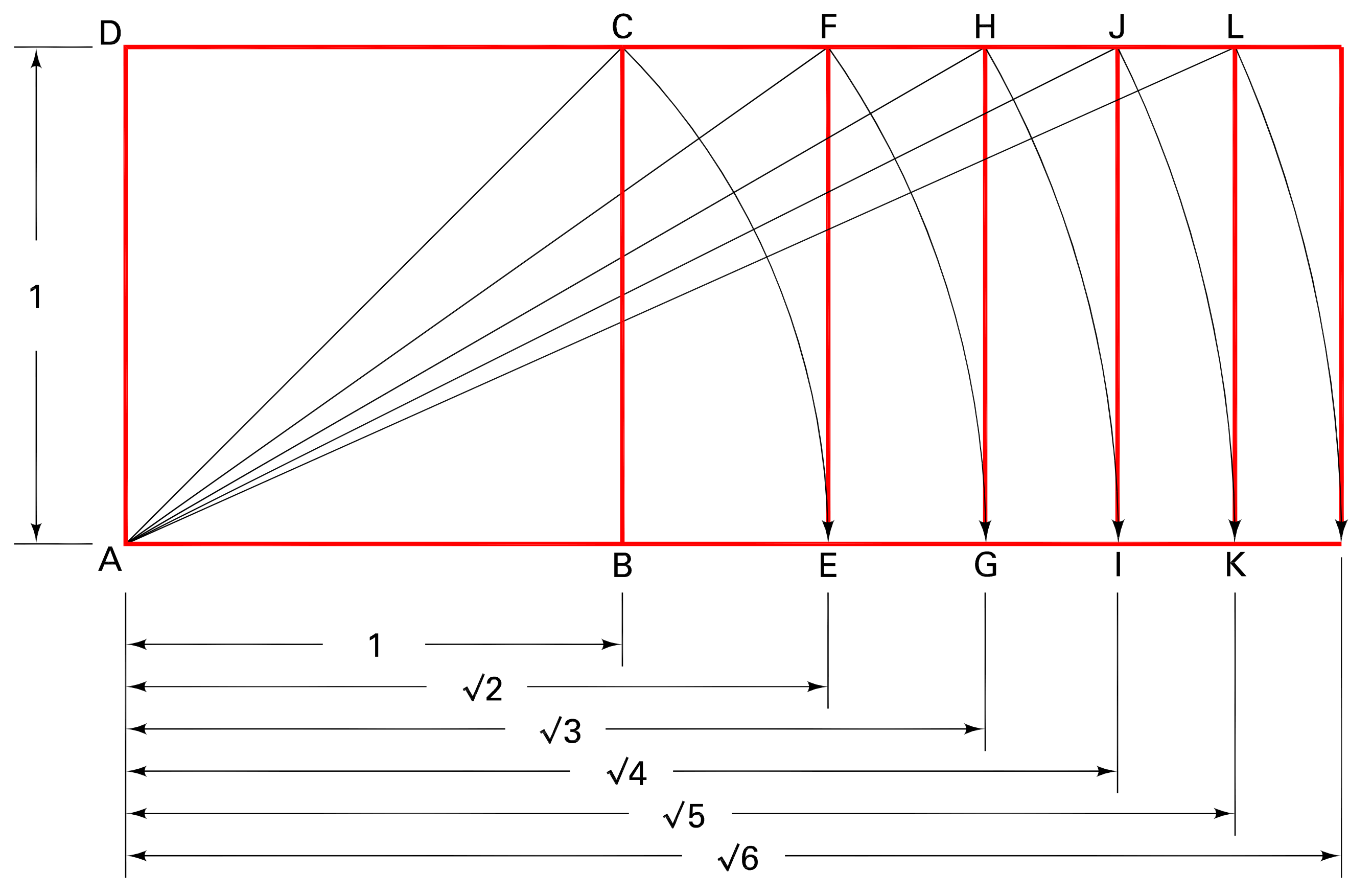
Root rectangles illustrate a construction of the square root of 6

In plane geometry, the square root of 6 can be constructed via a sequence of dynamic rectangles, as illustrated here.

In solid geometry, the square root of 6 appears as the longest distances between corners (vertices) of the double cube, as illustrated above. The square roots of all lower natural numbers appear as the distances between other vertex pairs in the double cube (including the vertices of the included two cubes).

The edge length of a cube with total surface area of 1 is $\frac{\sqrt{6}}{6}$ or the reciprocal square root of 6. The edge lengths of a regular tetrahedron (t), a regular octahedron (o), and a cube (c) of equal total surface areas satisfy $\frac{t\cdot o}{c^2} = \sqrt{6}$.

The edge length of a regular octahedron is the square root of 6 times the radius of an inscribed sphere (that is, the distance from the center of the solid to the center of each face).

== Trigonometry ==
The square root of 6, with the square root of 2 added or subtracted, appears in several exact trigonometric values for angles at multiples of 15 degrees ($\pi/12$ radians).

== In culture ==
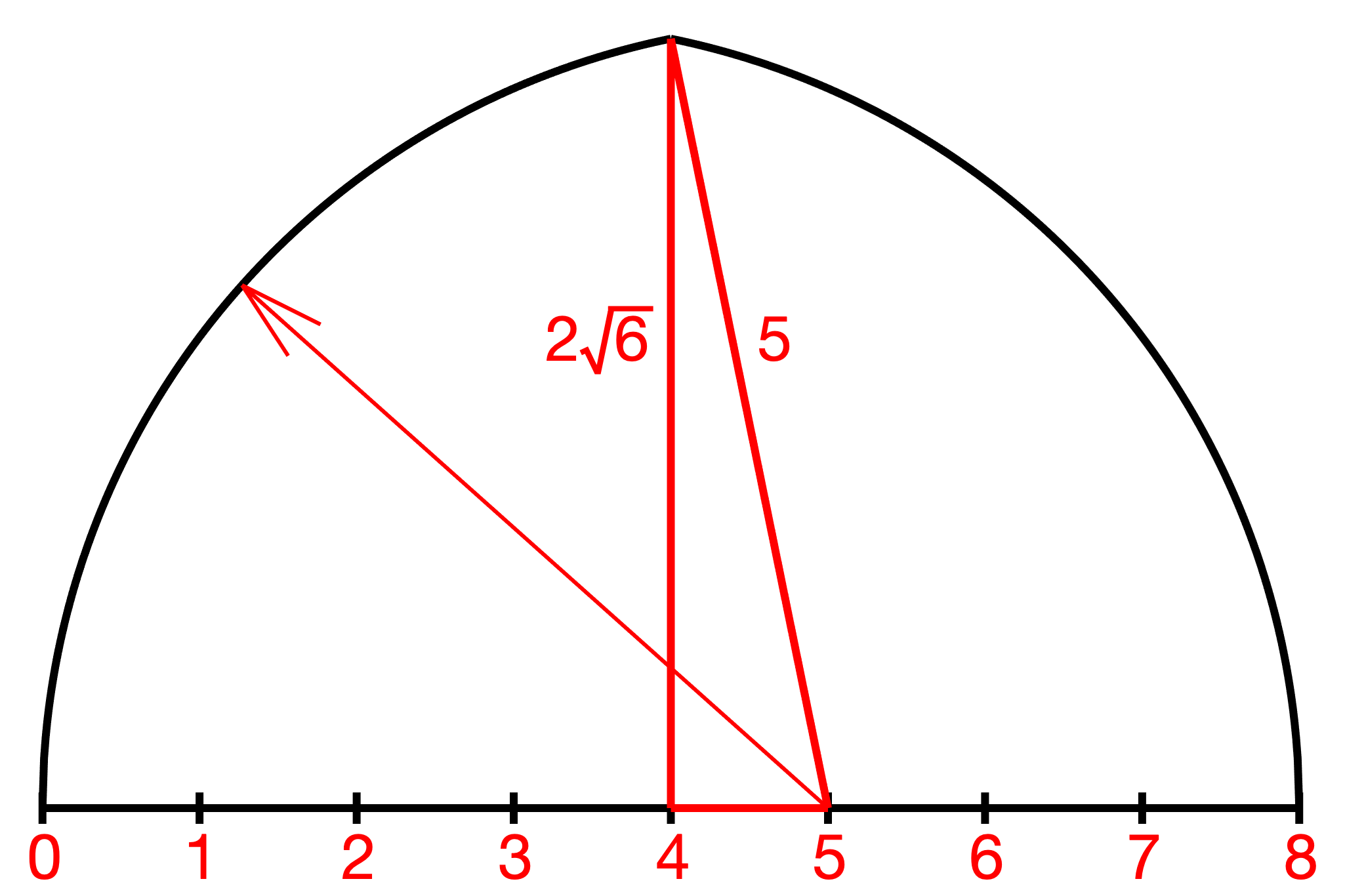
13th-century fifth-point arch shape, according to Branner's 1960 interpretation (Paris, Bibliothèque nationale de France, MS Fr 19093) of the 13th-century Picard artist Villard de Honnecourt

Villard de Honnecourt's 13th century construction of a Gothic "fifth-point arch" with circular arcs of radius 5 has a height of twice the square root of 6, as illustrated here.

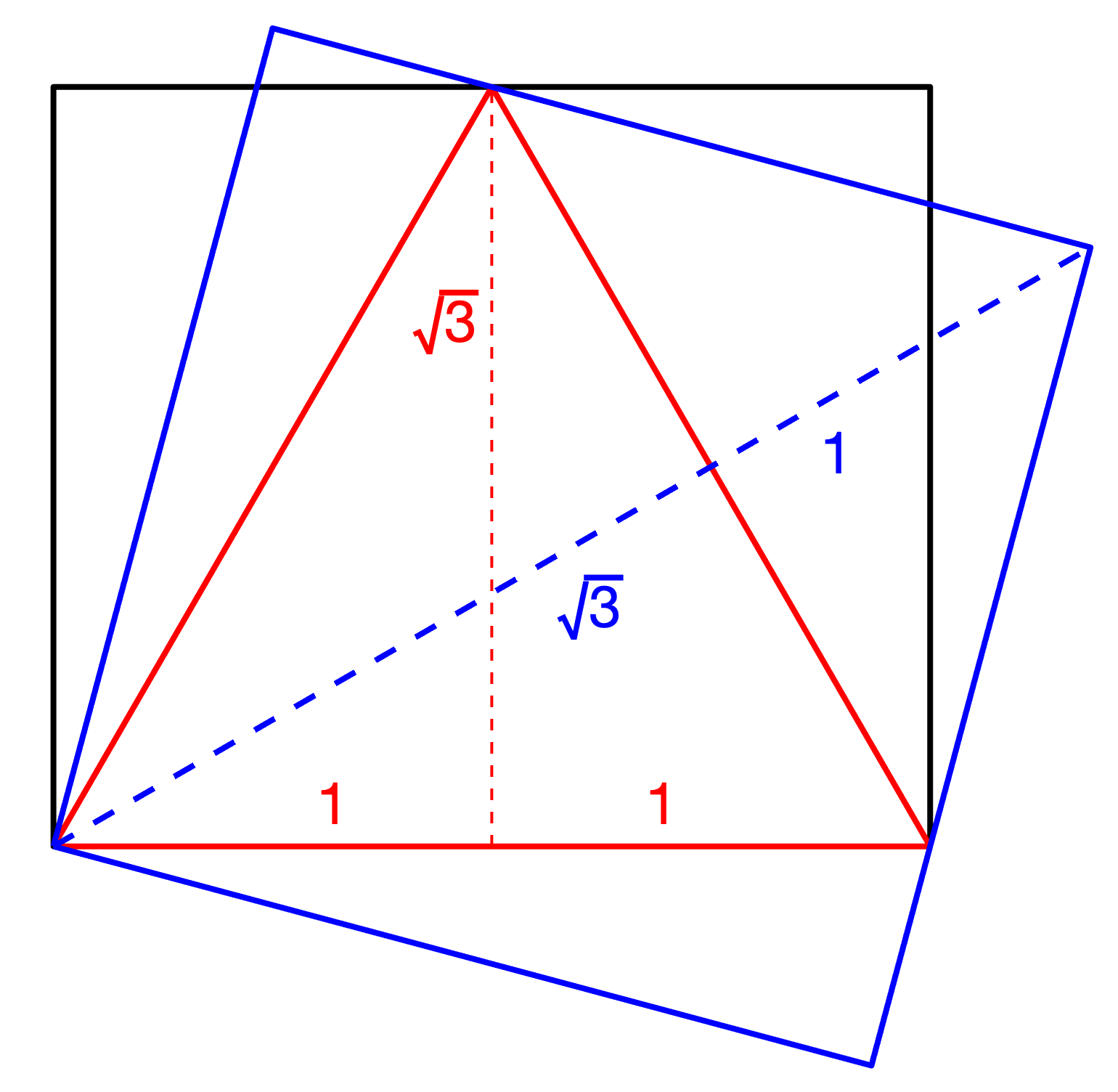
An equilateral triangle with circumscribed rectangle and square; the side of the square is $(\sqrt{6}+\sqrt{2})/2$, and the diagonal of the rectangle is the square root of 7.

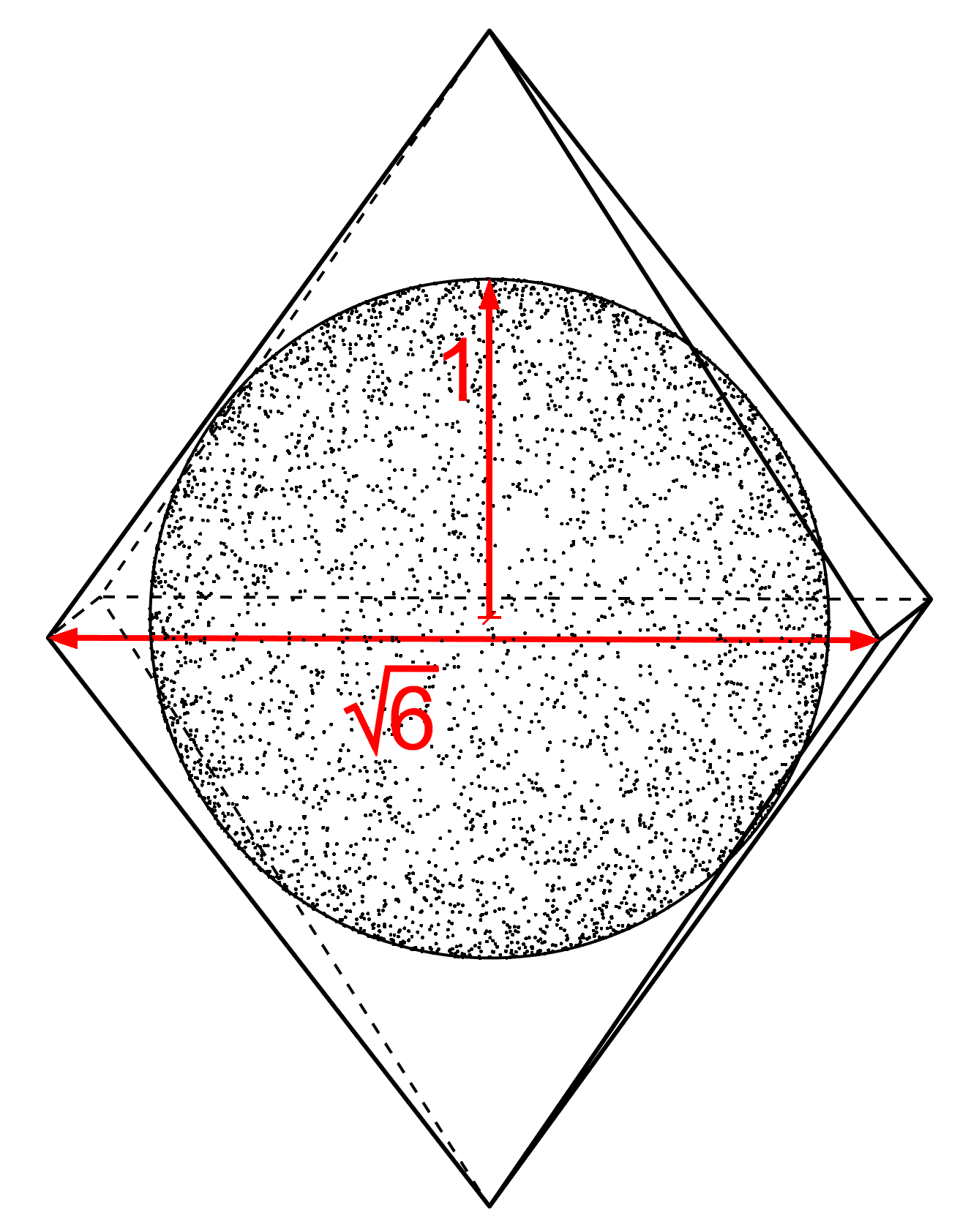
A regular octahedron with an inscribed sphere, illustrating the square root of 6 ratio between edge length and radius

== See also ==
- Square root
- Square root of 2
- Square root of 3
- Square root of 5
- Square root of 7
