= Square root of 8 =

Unique positive real number which when multiplied by itself gives 8

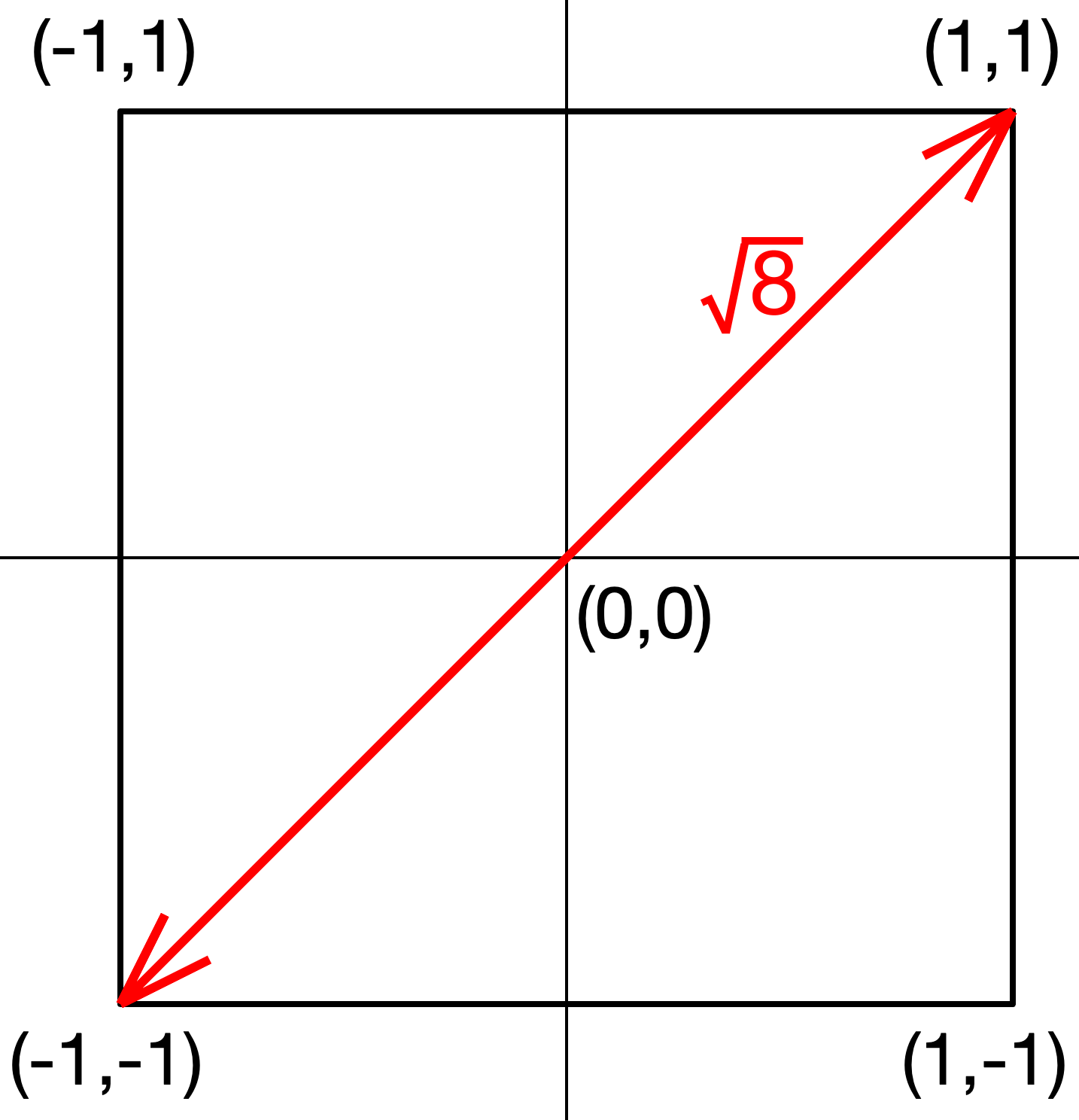
Illustration of the square root of 8 as the diagonal of a square with corners at unit coordinates

The square root of 8 is the positive real number that, when multiplied by itself, gives the natural number 8. It is more precisely called the principal square root of 8, to distinguish it from the negative number with the same property. This number appears in numerous geometric and number-theoretic contexts, and in classical philosophy and musical acoustics. It is the second Lagrange number in Diophantine approximation, arises in Plato's Meno as the side length of a square having twice the area of a square of side 2, and is the ratio used in Johann Gottlob Töpfer's system of organ flue pipe scaling.

== Denotation and approximations ==
It can be denoted in surd form as $\sqrt{8}$ and in exponent form as $8^\frac{1}{2}$. It is exactly twice the square root of 2, a characteristic that mathematician James Kyle described as "particularly interesting".

It is an irrational algebraic number. The first sixty significant digits of its decimal expansion are:

2.82842712474619009760337744841939615713934375075389614635335....

A convenient rational approximation for the square root of 8 is 17/6 (≈ 2.8333), accurate to within approximately 0.17%. The rational approximation 82/29 (≈2.8276), has an error of less than 0.03%, and the rational approximation 99/35 (≈2.82857142857...) has an error of 0.000144.

As a periodic continued fraction, the square root of 8 can be represented with a simple repeating pattern of integers:

$\sqrt{8}$	= [2; 1, 4, 1, 4, ...]

Because the square root of nine is a rational number, the square root of eight is also the largest irrational number that is the square root of a single digit whole number.

The On-Line Encyclopedia of Integer Sequences lists the sequence for the decimal digits of the square root of 8 at A010466.

== Usage in Plato's Meno ==
As Socrates demonstrates in Plato's dialogue, Meno, the blue square is twice the area of the yellow square.

The geometric quantity modernly denoted as the square root of eight is implicitly referenced in Plato's dialogue, Meno. There, Socrates demonstrates that the side of a square having twice the area of a square of side 2 is the diagonal of the original square. Socrates uses this demonstration to argue for his method of questioning and recollection by interrogating a slave who is ignorant of geometry.

Socrates begins one of the most influential dialogues of Western philosophy regarding the argument for inborn knowledge. By drawing geometric figures in the ground Socrates demonstrates that the slave is initially unaware of the length that a side must be in order to double the area of a square with 2-foot sides. The slave guesses first that the original side must be doubled in length (4 feet), and when this proves too much, that it must be 3 feet. This is still too much, and the slave is at a loss. Socrates then adds three more squares to the original square, to form a larger square four times the size. He draws four diagonal lines which bisect each of the smaller squares. Through questioning, Socrates leads the slave to the discovery that the square formed by these diagonals has an area of eight square feet, double that of the original. He asserts that the slave has "spontaneously recovered" knowledge which he knew from before he was born, without having been taught.

Platonic philosopher Malcolm S. Brown interpreted Socrates' shift from asking for the length of the side of the eight-foot square to asking the slave-boy to identify the line itself as a concession that the boy could not grasp the concept of the square root of 8, whereas Adam Weiler Gur Arye argued that the lesson was intended from the outset to demonstrate the geometric construction based on the square's diagonal, making the exact numerical value incidental.

== Applications in other problems ==
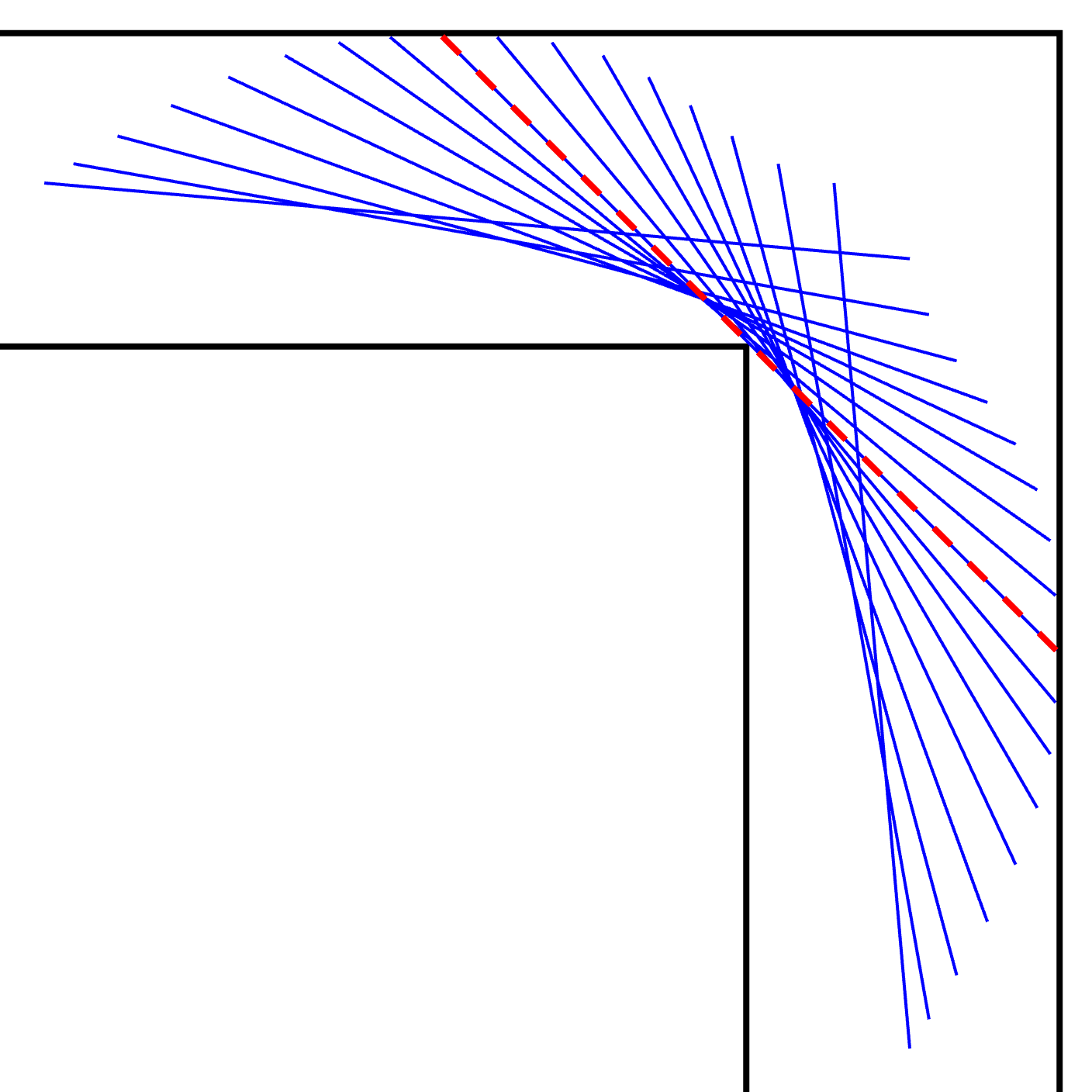
The problem of the longest ladder that can be carried around a corner in a hallway of width 1. The illustrated trajectory is not unique except at the tightest spot.

In the theory of Diophantine approximation, the square root of 8 is the second Lagrange number, representing the optimal approximation constant for irrational numbers equivalent to the square root of 2 after the golden-ratio class is excluded. As described by Steven R. Finch in his Mathematical Constants, "the next level of approximation difficulty is given by λ(ξ) = √8 for all ξ equivalent to Pythagoras' constant √2, that is, possessing partial denominators that are eventually all 2s"; in other words, after excluding numbers equivalent to the golden ratio, the next level of approximation difficulty is represented by the constant, the square root of 8, which occurs for numbers equivalent to √2 and having continued-fraction partial denominators that are eventually all 2s.

The proof that the first two Lagrange numbers are the square root of 5 and the square root of 8 was published by Aleksandr Korkin and Yegor Ivanovich Zolotaryov in 1873. This result later inspired the work of Andrey Markov on what became known as Markov's theorem.

In classic geometric optimization, the square root of 8 is also "the length of the longest (rigid) ladder that can be carried horizontally around a right-angled corner in a hallway of unit width".

In organ flue pipe scaling, the square root of eight is used to describe the standard scaling system devised by Johann Gottlob Töpfer. Töpfer concluded that the cross-sectional area of organ pipes, rather than their diameter, should vary geometrically from one octave to the next. Choosing the geometric mean of the ratios 1:2 and 1:4 per octave yields an area ratio of $1:\sqrt{8}$, corresponding to a pipe diameter that halves every 16 semitone intervals. Töpfer found that this Normalmensur produced a relatively uniform volume and timbre across the organ keyboard.

== See also ==
- Square root of 5
- Square root of 6
- Square root of 7
- Square root of 10
