= Organ flue pipe scaling =

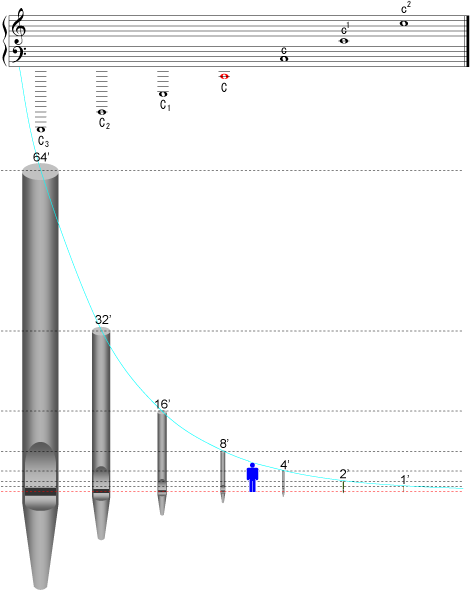
Relationship between number of feet, octave and size of an open flue pipe (1′ = 1 foot = about 32 cm)

Scaling is the ratio of an organ pipe's diameter to its length. The scaling of a pipe is a major influence on its timbre. Reed pipes are scaled according to different formulas than for flue pipes. In general, the larger the diameter of a given pipe at a given pitch, the fuller and more fundamental the sound becomes.

== The effect of the scale of a pipe on its timbre ==
The sound of an organ pipe is made up of a set of harmonics formed by acoustic resonance, with wavelengths that are fractions of the length of the pipe. There are nodes of stationary air, and antinodes of moving air, two of which will be the two ends of an open-ended organ-pipe (the mouth, and the open end at the top). The actual position of the antinodes is not exactly at the end of the pipe; rather it is slightly outside the end. The difference is called an end correction. The difference is larger for wider pipes. For example, at low frequencies, the additional effective length at the open pipe is about $e = 0.6r$, where $r$ is the radius of the pipe. However, the end correction is also smaller at higher frequencies. This shorter effective length raises the pitch of the resonance, so the higher resonant frequencies of the pipe are 'too high', sharp of where they should be, as natural harmonics of the fundamental note.

This effect suppresses the higher harmonics. The wider the pipe, the greater the suppression. Thus, other factors being equal, wide pipes are poor in harmonics, and narrow pipes are rich in harmonics. The scale of a pipe refers to its width compared to its length, and an organ builder will refer to a flute as a wide-scaled stop, and a string-toned gamba as a narrow-scaled stop.

== Dom Bédos de Celles and the problem of scaling across a rank of pipes ==
The lowest pipes in a rank are long, and the highest are short. The progression of the length of pipes is dictated by physics alone, and the length must halve for each octave. Since there are twelve semitones in an octave, each pipe differs from its neighbours by a factor of $\sqrt[12]{2}$. If the diameters of the pipes are scaled in the same way, so each pipe has exactly the same proportions, it is found that the perceived timbre and volume vary greatly between the low notes and the high, and the result is not musically satisfactory. This effect has been known since antiquity, and part of the organ builder's art is to scale pipes such that the timbre and volume of a rank vary little, or only according to the wishes of the builder. One of the first authors to publish data on the scaling of organ pipes was Dom Bédos de Celles. The basis of his scale was unknown until Mahrenholz discovered that the scale was based on one in which the width halved for each octave, but with addition of a constant. This constant compensates for the inappropriate narrowing of the highest pipes, and if chosen with care, can match modern scalings to within the difference of diameter that one would expect from pipes sounding notes about two semi-tones apart.

== Töpfer's Normalmensur ==
The system most commonly used to fully document and describe scaling was devised by Johann Gottlob Töpfer. Since varying the diameter of a pipe in direct proportion to its length (which means it varies by a factor of 1:2 per octave) caused the pipes to narrow too rapidly, and keeping the diameter constant (a factor of 1:1 per octave) was too little, the correct change in scale must be between these values. Töpfer reasoned that the cross-sectional area of the pipe was the critical factor, and he chose to vary this by the geometric mean of the ratios 1:2 and 1:4 per octave. This meant that the cross-sectional area varied as $1 : \sqrt{8}$. In consequence, the diameter of the pipe halved after 16 semitone intervals, i.e. on the 17th note (musicians count the starting-note as the first, so if C is the first note, C# is the second, differing by one semitone). Töpfer was able to confirm that if the diameter of the pipes in a rank halved on the 17th note, its volume and timbre remained adequately constant across the entire organ keyboard. He established this as a standard scale, or in German, Normalmensur, with the additional stipulation that the internal diameter be 155.5 mm (6.12 in) at 8′ C (the lowest note of the modern organ compass) and the mouth width one-quarter of the circumference of such a pipe.

Töpfer's system provides a reference scale, from which the scale of other pipe ranks can be described by means of half-tone deviations larger or smaller (indicated by the abbreviation ht). A rank that also halves in diameter at the 17th note but is somewhat wider could be described as "+ 2 ht" meaning that the pipe corresponding to the note "D" has the width expected for a pipe of the note "C", two semitones below (and therefore two semitone intervals wider). If a rank does not halve exactly at the 17th note, then its relationship to the Normalmensur will vary across the keyboard. The system can therefore be used to produce Normalmensur variation tables or line graphs for the analysis of existing ranks or the design of new ranks.

The following is a list of representative 8′ stops in order of increasing diameter (and, therefore, of increasingly fundamental tone) at middle C with respect to Normalmensur, which is listed in the middle. Deviations from Normalmensur are provided after the pipe measurement in brackets.

- Viole d'orchestre (thin, mordant string stop): 35.6 mm [-10 ht]
- Salicional (broader-toned, non-imitative string stop): 40.6 mm [-7 ht]
- Violin diapason (thin-toned principal stop): 46.2 mm [-4 ht]
- Principal (typical mid-scale principal stop): 50.4 mm [-2 ht]
- Normalmensur: 54.9 mm [+/-0 ht]
- Open diapason (broader-toned principal stop): 57.4 mm [+1 ht]
- Gedeckt (thin-toned flute stop): 65.4 mm [+4 ht]
- Flûte à cheminée (typical mid-scale flute stop): 74.4 mm [+7 ht]
- Flûte ouverte (broader-toned flute stop): 81.1 mm [+9 ht]

Normalmensur scaling table, 17th halving ratio:

		32′		16′		8′		4′		2′		1′		1/2′		1/4′		1/8′		1/16′
	mm	scale	mm	scale	mm	scale	mm	scale	mm	scale	mm	scale	mm	scale	mm	scale	mm	scale	mm	scale
C 1	439.7	20	261.5	32	155.5	44	92.4	56	54.9	68	32.6	80	19.3	92	11.5	104	6.8	116	4.0	128
C# 2	421.2	21	250.4	33	148.9	45	88.5	57	52.6	69	31.3	81	18.6	93	11.0	105	6.5	117	3.9	129
D 3	403.2	22	239.8	34	142.6	46	84.7	58	50.4	70	29.9	82	17.8	94	10.5	106	6.3	118	3.7	130
D# 4	386.2	23	229.6	35	136.5	47	81.1	59	48.2	71	28.7	83	16.9	95	10.1	107	6.0	119	3.6	131
E 5	369.9	24	219.9	36	130.7	48	77.7	60	46.2	72	27.4	84	16.3	96	9.7	108	5.7	120	3.4	132
F 6	354.1	25	210.6	37	125.2	49	74.4	61	44.2	73	26.3	85	15.6	97	9.3	109	5.5	121	3.3	133
F# 7	339.1	26	201.6	38	119.9	50	71.3	62	42.3	74	25.2	86	14.9	98	8.8	110	5.2	122	3.1	134
G 8	324.7	27	193.1	39	114.8	51	68.2	63	40.5	75	24.1	87	14.3	99	8.5	111	5.0	123	3.0	135
G# 9	311.0	28	184.9	40	109.9	52	65.3	64	38.8	76	23.1	88	13.7	100	8.1	112	4.8	124	2.8	136
A 10	297.8	29	177.1	41	105.3	53	62.6	65	37.2	77	22.1	89	13.1	101	7.8	113	4.6	125	2.7	137
A# 11	285.2	30	169.5	42	100.8	54	59.9	66	35.6	78	21.1	90	12.6	102	7.4	114	4.4	126	2.6	138
B 12	273.1	31	162.3	43	96.5	55	57.4	67	34.1	79	20.2	91	12.0	103	7.1	115	4.2	127	2.5	139

From Organ Supply Industries catalog
