= Square root of 2 =

Unique positive real number which when multiplied by itself gives 2

- The square root of 2 is equal to the length of the hypotenuse of an isosceles right triangle with legs of length 1.
- Rationality: Irrational

Representations
- Decimal: 1.4142135623730950488...
- Continued fraction: $1 + \cfrac{1}{2 + \cfrac{1}{2 + \cfrac{1}{2 + \cfrac{1}{2 + \ddots}}}}$

The square root of 2 (approximately 1.4142) is the positive real number that, when multiplied by itself or squared, equals the number 2. It may be written as $\sqrt{2}$ or $2^{1/2}$. It is an algebraic number, and therefore not a transcendental number. Technically, it should be called the principal square root of 2, to distinguish it from the negative number with the same property.

Geometrically, the square root of 2 is the length of a diagonal across a square with sides of one unit of length; this follows from the Pythagorean theorem. It was probably the first number known to be irrational. The fraction 99/70 (≈ 1.4142857) is sometimes used as a good rational approximation with a reasonably small denominator.

Sequence A002193 in the On-Line Encyclopedia of Integer Sequences consists of the digits in the decimal expansion of the square root of 2, here truncated to 30 decimal places:

1.414213562373095048801688724209

== History ==
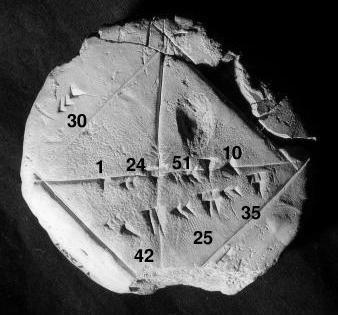
Babylonian clay tablet YBC 7289 with annotations. Besides showing the square root of 2 in sexagesimal (1 24 51 10), the tablet also gives an example where one side of the square is 30 and the diagonal then is 42 25 35. The sexagesimal digit 30 can also stand for 0 30 = 1/2, in which case 0 42 25 35 is approximately 0.7071065.

The Babylonian clay tablet YBC 7289 (c. 1800–1600 BC) gives an approximation of $\sqrt{2}$ in four sexagesimal figures, 1 24 51 10, which is accurate to about six decimal digits, and is the closest possible three-place sexagesimal representation of $\sqrt{2}$, representing a margin of error of only –0.000042%:
$$1 + \frac{24}{60} + \frac{51}{60^2} + \frac{10}{60^3} = \frac{305470}{216000} = 1.41421\overline{296}.$$

Another early approximation is given in ancient Indian mathematical texts, the Sulbasutras (c. 800–200 BC), as follows: "Increase the length [of the side] by its third and this third by its own fourth less the thirty-fourth part of that fourth." That is,
$$1 + \frac{1}{3} + \frac{1}{3 \times 4} - \frac{1}{3 \times4 \times 34} = \frac{577}{408} = 1.41421\overline{56862745098039}.$$

This approximation is the seventh in a sequence of increasingly accurate approximations based on the sequence of Pell numbers, which can be derived from the continued fraction expansion of $\sqrt{2}$. Despite having a smaller denominator, it is only slightly less accurate than the Babylonian approximation.

Pythagoreans discovered that the diagonal of a square is incommensurable with its side, or in modern language, that the square root of two is irrational. Little is known with certainty about the time or circumstances of this discovery, but the name of Hippasus of Metapontum is often mentioned. For a while, the Pythagoreans treated as an official secret the discovery that the square root of two is irrational, and, according to legend, Hippasus was murdered for divulging it, though this has little if any substantial evidence in traditional historical practice. The square root of two is occasionally called Pythagoras's number or Pythagoras's constant.

=== Ancient Roman architecture ===
In ancient Roman architecture, Vitruvius describes the use of the square root of 2 progression or ad quadratum technique. It consists basically in a geometric, rather than arithmetic, method to double a square, in which the diagonal of the original square is equal to the side of the resulting square. Vitruvius attributes the idea to Plato. The system was employed to build pavements by creating a square tangent to the corners of the original square at 45 degrees of it. The proportion was also used to design atria by giving them a length equal to a diagonal taken from a square, whose sides are equivalent to the intended atrium's width.

== Decimal value ==
=== Computation algorithms ===
There are many algorithms for approximating $\sqrt{2}$ as a ratio of integers or as a decimal. The most common algorithm for this, which is used as a basis in many computers and calculators, is the Babylonian method for computing square roots, an example of Newton's method for computing roots of arbitrary functions. It goes as follows:

First, pick a guess, $a_0 > 0$; the value of the guess affects only how many iterations are required to reach an approximation of a certain accuracy. Then, using that guess, iterate through the following recursive computation:

$$a_{n+1} = \frac12\left(a_n + \dfrac{2}{a_n}\right)=\frac{a_n}{2}+\frac{1}{a_n}.$$

Each iteration improves the approximation, roughly doubling the number of correct digits. Starting with $a_0=1$, the subsequent iterations yield:

$$\begin{alignat}{3}
a_1 &= \tfrac{3}{2} &&= \mathbf{1}.5, \\
a_2 &= \tfrac{17}{12} &&= \mathbf{1.41}6\ldots, \\
a_3 &= \tfrac{577}{408} &&= \mathbf{1.41421}5\ldots, \\
a_4 &= \tfrac{665857}{470832} &&= \mathbf{1.41421356237}46\ldots, \\
&\qquad \vdots
\end{alignat}$$

These fractions are all solutions of the Pell equation $x^2-2y^2=1$ (see below).

=== Rational approximations ===
The Babylonians had approximated the number as $1+ \frac{24}{60}+\frac{51}{60^2}+\frac{10}{60^3}=1.41421\overline{296}$.

The rational approximation 99/70 (≈ 1.4142857) differs from the correct value by less than 1/10,000 (approx. +0.72×10^{−4}). Likewise, 140/99 (≈ 1.4141414...) has a marginally smaller error (approx. −0.72×10^{−4}), and 239/169 (≈ 1.4142012) has an error of approximately −0.12×10^{−4}.

The rational approximation of the square root of two derived from four iterations of the Babylonian method after starting with a_{0} = 1 (665,857/470,832) is too large by about 1.6×10^{−12}; its square is ≈ 2.0000000000045.

=== Approximation by Pell's equation ===
Good rational approximations of $\sqrt2$ are obtained from the positive integer solutions of the Pell equation $x^2-2y^2=1$ and of the negative Pell equation $x^2-2y^2=-1$; the solutions of these two equations were already studied in antiquity as side and diameter numbers. If $x^2-2y^2=\pm1$, then
$$\left|\sqrt2-\frac{x}{y}\right| = \frac{|x^2-2y^2|}{y^2\left(\frac{x}{y}+\sqrt2\right)} = \frac{1}{y\left(x+y\sqrt2\right)} \approx \frac{1}{2\sqrt2\,y^2},$$
so the error is of the order of $1/y^2$. Solutions of $x^2-2y^2=1$ give approximations that are slightly too large, and solutions of $x^2-2y^2=-1$ give approximations that are slightly too small.

The smallest positive solution, or fundamental solution, of $x^2-2y^2=-1$ is $(1,1)$, and $(3,2)$ is the fundamental solution of $x^2-2y^2=1$. All further solutions follow by taking powers of $1+\sqrt2$: odd powers give the solutions of $x^2-2y^2=-1$ and even powers those of $x^2-2y^2=1$, and the resulting approximations approach $\sqrt2$ from both sides:
$$\frac{1}{1} < \frac{7}{5} < \frac{41}{29} < \frac{239}{169} < \cdots < \sqrt2 < \cdots < \frac{577}{408} < \frac{99}{70} < \frac{17}{12} < \frac{3}{2}.$$
Each of these fractions is a convergent of the continued fraction of $\sqrt2$. This follows from a theorem of Legendre: every fraction $p/q$ with $\left|\sqrt2-p/q\right|<1/(2q^2)$ is a convergent.

One step of the Babylonian method maps $x/y$ to $(x^2+2y^2)/(2xy)$, and if $x^2-2y^2=\pm1$ then $(x^2+2y^2)^2-2(2xy)^2=1$. Starting from $1$, the iterates $3/2,\ 17/12,\ 577/408,\ 665857/470832,\ \ldots$ are therefore solutions of the Pell equation, as are the Sulbasutra value $577/408$ and the approximation $99/70$ mentioned above.

=== Records in computation ===
In 1997, the value of $\sqrt{2}$ was calculated to 137,438,953,444 decimal places by Yasumasa Kanada's team. In February 2006, the record for the calculation of $\sqrt{2}$ was eclipsed with the use of a home computer. Shigeru Kondo calculated one trillion decimal places in 2010. Other mathematical constants whose decimal expansions have been calculated to similarly high precision include π, e, and the golden ratio. Such computations provide empirical evidence of whether these numbers are normal.

This is a table of recent records in calculating the digits of $\sqrt{2}$.

Date	Name	Number of digits
4 April 2025	Teck Por Lim	24000000000000
26 December 2023	Jordan Ranous	20000000000000
5 January 2022	Tizian Hanselmann	10000000001000
28 June 2016	Ron Watkins	10000000000000
3 April 2016	Ron Watkins	5000000000000
20 January 2016	Ron Watkins	2000000000100
9 February 2012	Alexander Yee	2000000000050
22 March 2010	Shigeru Kondo	1000000000000

== Proofs of irrationality ==
=== Proof by infinite descent ===
One proof of the number's irrationality is the following proof by infinite descent. It is also a proof of a negation by refutation: it proves the statement "$\sqrt{2}$ is not rational" by assuming that it is rational and then deriving a falsehood.

1. Assume that $\sqrt{2}$ is a rational number, meaning that there exists a pair of integers whose ratio is exactly $\sqrt{2}$.
2. If the two integers have a common factor, it can be eliminated using the Euclidean algorithm.
3. Then $\sqrt{2}$ can be written as an irreducible fraction $\frac{a}{b}$ such that a and b are coprime integers (having no common factor) which additionally means that at least one of a or b must be odd.
4. It follows that $\frac{a^2}{b^2}=2$ and $a^2=2b^2$. ( (a/b)^{n} = a^{n}/b^{n} ) ( a^{2} and b^{2} are integers)
5. Therefore, a^{2} is even because it is equal to 2b^{2}. (2b^{2} is necessarily even because it is 2 times another whole number.)
6. It follows that a must be even (as squares of odd integers are never even).
7. Because a is even, there exists an integer k that fulfills $a = 2k$.
8. Substituting 2k from step 7 for a in the second equation of step 4: $2b^2 = a^2 = (2k)^2 = 4k^2$, which is equivalent to $b^2=2k^2$.
9. Because 2k^{2} is divisible by two and therefore even, and because $2k^2=b^2$, it follows that b^{2} is also even which means that b is even.
10. By steps 5 and 8, a and b are both even, which contradicts step 3 (that $\frac{a}{b}$ is irreducible).

Since a falsehood has been derived, the assumption (1) that $\sqrt{2}$ is a rational number must be false. This means that $\sqrt{2}$ is not a rational number; that is to say, $\sqrt{2}$ is irrational.

This proof was hinted at by Aristotle, in his Analytica Priora, §I.23. It appeared first as a full proof in Euclid's Elements, as proposition 117 of Book X. However, since the early 19th century, historians have agreed that this proof is an interpolation and not attributable to Euclid.

=== Proof using reciprocals ===
Assume by way of contradiction that $\sqrt 2$ were rational. Then we may write $\sqrt 2 + 1 = \frac{q}{p}$ as an irreducible fraction in lowest terms, with coprime positive integers $q>p$. Since $(\sqrt 2-1)(\sqrt 2+1)=2-1^2=1$, it follows that $\sqrt 2-1$ can be expressed as the irreducible fraction $\frac{p}{q}$. However, since $\sqrt 2-1$ and $\sqrt 2+1$ differ by an integer, it follows that the denominators of their irreducible fraction representations must be the same, i.e. $q=p$. This gives the desired contradiction.

=== Proof by unique factorization ===
As with the proof by infinite descent, we obtain $a^2 = 2b^2$. Being the same quantity, each side has the same prime factorization by the fundamental theorem of arithmetic, and in particular, would have to have the factor 2 occur the same number of times. However, the factor 2 appears an odd number of times on the right, but an even number of times on the left—a contradiction.

=== Application of the rational root theorem ===
The irrationality of $\sqrt{2}$ also follows from the rational root theorem, which states that a rational root of a polynomial, if it exists, must be the quotient of a factor of the constant term and a factor of the leading coefficient. In the case of $p(x) = x^2 - 2$, the only possible rational roots are $\pm 1$ and $\pm 2$. As $\sqrt{2}$ is not equal to $\pm 1$ or $\pm 2$, it follows that $\sqrt{2}$ is irrational. This application also invokes the integer root theorem, a stronger version of the rational root theorem for the case when $p(x)$ is a monic polynomial with integer coefficients; for such a polynomial, all roots are necessarily integers (which $\sqrt{2}$ is not, as 2 is not a perfect square) or irrational.

The rational root theorem (or integer root theorem) may be used to show that any square root of any natural number that is not a perfect square is irrational. For other proofs that the square root of any non-square natural number is irrational, see Quadratic irrational number or Infinite descent.

=== Geometric proofs ===
==== Tennenbaum's proof ====
Figure 1. Stanley Tennenbaum's geometric proof of the irrationality of √2

A simple proof is attributed to Stanley Tennenbaum when he was a student in the early 1950s. Assume that $\sqrt{2} = a/b$, where $a$ and $b$ are coprime positive integers. Then $a$ and $b$ are the smallest positive integers for which $a^2 = 2b^2$. Geometrically, this implies that a square with side length $a$ will have an area equal to two squares of (lesser) side length $b$. Call these squares A and B. We can draw these squares and compare their areas - the simplest way to do so is to fit the two B squares into the A squares. When we try to do so, we end up with the arrangement in Figure 1., in which the two B squares overlap in the middle and two uncovered areas are present in the top left and bottom right. In order to assert $a^2 = 2b^2$, we would need to show that the area of the overlap is equal to the area of the two missing areas, i.e. $(2b-a)^2$ = $2(a-b)^2$. In other terms, we may refer to the side lengths of the overlap and missing areas as $p = 2b-a$ and $q = a-b$, respectively, and thus we have $p^2 = 2q^2$. But since we can see from the diagram that $p < a$ and $q < b$, and we know that $p$ and $q$ are integers from their definitions in terms of $a$ and $b$, this means that we are in violation of the original assumption that $a$ and $b$ are the smallest positive integers for which $a^2 = 2b^2$.

Hence, even in assuming that $a$ and $b$ are the smallest positive integers for which $a^2 = 2b^2$, we may prove that there exists a smaller pair of integers $p$ and $q$ which satisfy the relation. This contradiction within the definition of $a$ and $b$ implies that they cannot exist, and thus $\sqrt{2}$ must be irrational.

==== Apostol's proof ====
Figure 2. Tom Apostol's geometric proof of the irrationality of √2

Tom M. Apostol made another geometric reductio ad absurdum argument showing that $\sqrt{2}$ is irrational. It is also an example of proof by infinite descent. It makes use of compass and straightedge construction, proving the theorem by a method similar to that employed by ancient Greek geometers. It is essentially the same algebraic proof as Tennebaum's proof, viewed geometrically in another way.

Let △ ABC be a right isosceles triangle with hypotenuse length m and legs n as shown in Figure 2. By the Pythagorean theorem, $\frac{m}{n}=\sqrt{2}$. Suppose m and n are integers. Let m:n be a ratio given in its lowest terms.

Draw the arcs BD and CE with centre A. Join DE. It follows that AB = AD, AC = AE and ∠BAC and ∠DAE coincide. Therefore, the triangles ABC and ADE are congruent by SAS.

Because ∠EBF is a right angle and ∠BEF is half a right angle, △ BEF is also a right isosceles triangle. Hence BE = m − n implies BF = m − n. By symmetry, DF = m − n, and △ FDC is also a right isosceles triangle. It also follows that FC = n − (m − n) = 2n − m.

Hence, there is an even smaller right isosceles triangle, with hypotenuse length 2n − m and legs m − n. These values are integers even smaller than m and n and in the same ratio, contradicting the hypothesis that m:n is in lowest terms. Therefore, m and n cannot be both integers; hence, $\sqrt{2}$ is irrational.

=== Constructive proof ===
While the proofs by infinite descent are constructively valid when "irrational" is defined to mean "not rational", we can obtain a constructively stronger statement by using a positive definition of "irrational" as "quantifiably apart from every rational". Let a and b be positive integers such that 1<a/b< 3/2 (as 1<2< 9/4 satisfies these bounds). Now 2b^{2} and a^{2} cannot be equal, since the first has an odd number of factors 2 whereas the second has an even number of factors 2. Thus |2b^{2} − a^{2}| ≥ 1. Multiplying the absolute difference |√2 − a/b| by b^{2}(√2 + a/b) in the numerator and denominator, we get

$$\left|\sqrt2 - \frac{a}{b}\right| = \frac{|2b^2-a^2|}{b^2\!\left(\sqrt{2}+\frac{a}{b}\right)} \ge \frac{1}{b^2\!\left(\sqrt2 + \frac{a}{b}\right)} \ge \frac{1}{3b^2},$$

the latter inequality being true because it is assumed that 1<a/b< 3/2, giving a/b + √2 ≤ 3 (otherwise the quantitative apartness can be trivially established). This gives a lower bound of 1/3b^{2} for the difference |√2 − a/b|, yielding a direct proof of irrationality in its constructively stronger form, not relying on the law of excluded middle. This proof constructively exhibits an explicit discrepancy between $\sqrt{2}$ and any rational.

=== Proof by Pythagorean triples ===
This proof uses the following property of primitive Pythagorean triples:

If a, b, and c are coprime positive integers such that a^{2} + b^{2} = c^{2}, then c is never even.

This lemma can be used to show that two identical perfect squares can never be added to produce another perfect square.

Suppose the contrary that $\sqrt2$ is rational. Therefore,

$$\sqrt2 = {a \over b}$$
where $a,b \in \mathbb{Z}$ and $\gcd(a,b) = 1$
Squaring both sides,
$$2 = {a^2 \over b^2}$$
$$2b^2 = a^2$$
$$b^2+b^2 = a^2$$

Here, (b, b, a) is a primitive Pythagorean triple, and from the lemma a is never even. However, this contradicts the equation 2b^{2} = a^{2} which implies that a must be even.

== Multiplicative inverse ==
The multiplicative inverse (reciprocal) of the square root of two, which is equal to its half, is a widely used constant, with the decimal value:

$$\frac{1}{\sqrt{2}} = \frac{\sqrt{2}}{2} =$$

0.70710678118654752440084436210484903928483593768847...

It is often encountered in geometry and trigonometry because the unit vector, which makes a 45° angle with the axes in a plane, has the coordinates

$$\left(\frac{\sqrt{2}}{2}, \frac{\sqrt{2}}{2}\right)\!.$$

Each coordinate satisfies

$$\frac{\sqrt{2}}{2} = \sqrt{\tfrac{1}{2}} = \frac{1}{\sqrt{2}} = \sin 45^\circ = \cos 45^\circ.$$

== Properties ==
Angle size and sector area are the same when the conic radius is √2. This diagram illustrates the circular and hyperbolic functions based on sector areas u.

One interesting property of $\sqrt{2}$ is

$$\!\ {1 \over {\sqrt{2} - 1}} = \sqrt{2} + 1$$

since

$$\left(\sqrt{2}+1\right)\!\left(\sqrt{2}-1\right) = 2-1 = 1.$$

This is related to the property of silver ratios.

$\sqrt{2}$ can also be expressed in terms of copies of the imaginary unit i using only the square root and arithmetic operations, if the square root symbol is interpreted suitably for the complex numbers i and −i:

$$\frac{\sqrt{i}+i \sqrt{i}}{i}\text{ and }\frac{\sqrt{-i}-i \sqrt{-i}}{-i}$$

$\sqrt{2}$ is also the only real number other than 1 whose infinite tetration (i.e., infinite exponential tower) is equal to its square. In other words: if for c > 1, x_{1} = c and x_{n+1} = c^{x_{n}} for n > 1, the limit of x_{n} as n → ∞ will be called (if this limit exists) f(c). Then $\sqrt{2}$ is the only number c > 1 for which f(c) = c^{2}. Or symbolically:

$$\sqrt{2}^{\sqrt{2}^{\sqrt{2}^{~\cdot^{~\cdot^{~\cdot}}}}} = 2.$$

$\sqrt{2}$ appears in Viète's formula for π,

$$\frac2\pi = \sqrt\frac12 \cdot \sqrt{\frac12 + \frac12\sqrt\frac12} \cdot \sqrt{\frac12 + \frac12\sqrt{\frac12 + \frac12\sqrt\frac12}} \cdots,$$

which is related to the formula

$$\pi = \lim_{m\to\infty} 2^{m} \underbrace{\sqrt{2-\sqrt{2+\sqrt{2+\sqrt{2+\cdots+\sqrt{2}}}}}}_{m\text{ square roots}}\,.$$

Similar in appearance but with a finite number of terms, $\sqrt{2}$ appears in various trigonometric constants:

$$\begin{align}
\sin\frac{\pi}{32} &= \tfrac12\sqrt{2-\sqrt{2+\sqrt{2+\sqrt{2}}}} &\quad
\sin\frac{3\pi}{16} &= \tfrac12\sqrt{2-\sqrt{2-\sqrt{2}}} &\quad
\sin\frac{11\pi}{32} &= \tfrac12\sqrt{2+\sqrt{2-\sqrt{2-\sqrt{2}}}} \\[6pt]
\sin\frac{\pi}{16} &= \tfrac12\sqrt{2-\sqrt{2+\sqrt{2}}} &\quad
\sin\frac{7\pi}{32} &= \tfrac12\sqrt{2-\sqrt{2-\sqrt{2+\sqrt{2}}}} &\quad
\sin\frac{3\pi}{8} &= \tfrac12\sqrt{2+\sqrt{2}} \\[6pt]
\sin\frac{3\pi}{32} &= \tfrac12\sqrt{2-\sqrt{2+\sqrt{2-\sqrt{2}}}} &\quad
\sin\frac{\pi}{4} &= \tfrac12\sqrt{2} &\quad
\sin\frac{13\pi}{32} &= \tfrac12\sqrt{2+\sqrt{2+\sqrt{2-\sqrt{2}}}} \\[6pt]
\sin\frac{\pi}{8} &= \tfrac12\sqrt{2-\sqrt{2}} &\quad
\sin\frac{9\pi}{32} &= \tfrac12\sqrt{2+\sqrt{2-\sqrt{2+\sqrt{2}}}} &\quad
\sin\frac{7\pi}{16} &= \tfrac12\sqrt{2+\sqrt{2+\sqrt{2}}} \\[6pt]
\sin\frac{5\pi}{32} &= \tfrac12\sqrt{2-\sqrt{2-\sqrt{2-\sqrt{2}}}} &\quad
\sin\frac{5\pi}{16} &= \tfrac12\sqrt{2+\sqrt{2-\sqrt{2}}} &\quad
\sin\frac{15\pi}{32} &= \tfrac12\sqrt{2+\sqrt{2+\sqrt{2+\sqrt{2}}}}
\end{align}$$

It is not known whether $\sqrt{2}$ is a normal number, which is a stronger property than irrationality, but statistical analyses of its binary expansion are consistent with the hypothesis that it is normal to base two.

== Representations ==
=== Series and product ===
The identity cos π/4 = sin π/4 = 1/√2, along with the infinite product representations for the sine and cosine, leads to products such as

$$\frac{1}{\sqrt 2} = \prod_{k=0}^\infty \left(1-\frac{1}{(4k+2)^2}\right) =
\left(1-\frac{1}{4}\right)\!\left(1-\frac{1}{36}\right)\!\left(1-\frac{1}{100}\right) \cdots$$

and

$$\sqrt{2} = \prod_{k=0}^\infty\frac{(4k+2)^2}{(4k+1)(4k+3)} =
\left(\frac{2 \cdot 2}{1 \cdot 3}\right)\!\left(\frac{6 \cdot 6}{5 \cdot 7}\right)\!\left(\frac{10 \cdot 10}{9 \cdot 11}\right)\!\left(\frac{14 \cdot 14}{13 \cdot 15}\right) \cdots$$

or equivalently,

$$\sqrt{2} = \prod_{k=0}^\infty\left(1+\frac{1}{4k+1}\right)\left(1-\frac{1}{4k+3}\right) =
\left(1+\frac{1}{1}\right)\!\left(1-\frac{1}{3}\right)\!\left(1+\frac{1}{5}\right)\!\left(1-\frac{1}{7}\right) \cdots.$$

The number can also be expressed by taking the Taylor series of a trigonometric function. For example, the series for cos π/4 gives

$$\frac{1}{\sqrt{2}} = \sum_{k=0}^\infty \frac{(-1)^k \bigl(\frac{\pi}{4}\bigr)^{2k}}{(2k)!}.$$

The Taylor series of $\sqrt{1 + x}$ with x = 1 and using the double factorial n!! gives

$$\sqrt{2} = \sum_{k=0}^\infty (-1)^{k+1} \frac{(2k-3)!!}{(2k)!!} =
1 + \frac{1}{2} - \frac{1}{2\cdot4} + \frac{1\cdot3}{2\cdot4\cdot6} - \frac{1\cdot3\cdot5}{2\cdot4\cdot6\cdot8} + \cdots = 1 + \frac{1}{2} - \frac{1}{8} + \frac{1}{16} - \frac{5}{128} + \frac{7}{256} + \cdots.$$

The convergence of this series can be accelerated with an Euler transform, producing

$$\sqrt{2} = \sum_{k=0}^\infty \frac{(2k+1)!}{2^{3k+1}{(k!)}^2 } = \frac{1}{2} +\frac{3}{8} + \frac{15}{64} + \frac{35}{256} + \frac{315}{4096} + \frac{693}{16384} + \cdots.$$

It is not known whether $\sqrt{2}$ can be represented with a BBP-type formula. BBP-type formulas are known for $\pi\sqrt2$ and $\sqrt{2} \ln\left(1+\sqrt{2}~\!\right)$, however.

The number can be represented by an infinite series of Egyptian fractions, with denominators defined by 2^{n}th terms of a Fibonacci-like recurrence relation a(n) = 34a(n−1) − a(n−2), a(0) = 0, a(1) = 6:

$$\sqrt{2}=\frac{3}{2}-\frac{1}{2}\sum_{n=0}^\infty \frac{1}{a(2^n)}=\frac{3}{2}-\frac{1}{2}\left(\frac{1}{6}+\frac{1}{204}+\frac{1}{235416}+\dots \right).$$

=== Continued fraction ===
The square root of 2 and approximations by convergents of continued fractions

The square root of two has the following continued fraction representation:

$$\sqrt2 = 1 + \cfrac{1}{2 + \cfrac{1}{2 + \cfrac{1}{2 + \cfrac1\ddots}}}.$$

The convergents p/q formed by truncating this representation form a sequence of fractions that approximate the square root of two to increasing accuracy, and that are described by the Pell numbers (i.e., p^{2} − 2q^{2} = ±1; see above). The first convergents are: 1/1, 3/2, 7/5, 17/12, 41/29, 99/70, 239/169, 577/408 and the convergent following p/q is (p + 2q)/(p + q). The convergent p/q differs from $\sqrt{2}$ by almost exactly $\frac{1}{2 \sqrt{2}q^2}$, which follows from:

$$\left|\sqrt2 - \frac{p}{q}\right| = \frac{|2q^2-p^2|}{q^2\!\left(\sqrt{2}+\frac{p}{q}\right)} = \frac{1}{q^2\!\left(\sqrt2 + \frac{p}{q}\right)} \thickapprox \frac{1}{2\sqrt{2}q^2}$$

=== Nested square ===
The following nested square expressions converge to $\sqrt2$:

$$\begin{align}
\sqrt{2}
&= \tfrac32 - 2 \left( \tfrac14 - \left( \tfrac14 - \bigl( \tfrac14 - \cdots \bigr)^2 \right)^2 \right)^2 \\[10mu]
&= \tfrac32 - 4 \left( \tfrac18 + \left( \tfrac18 + \bigl( \tfrac18 + \cdots \bigr)^2 \right)^2 \right)^2.
\end{align}$$

== Applications ==
=== Paper size ===
The A series of paper sizes

In 1786, German physics professor Georg Christoph Lichtenberg found that any sheet of paper whose long edge is $\sqrt{2}$ times longer than its short edge could be folded in half and aligned with its shorter side to produce a sheet with exactly the same proportions as the original. If $S$ is the shorter side and $L$ is the longer side, then
$$\frac{L}{S}=\sqrt{2} \ \iff\ \frac{L}{S} = \frac{S}{L/2}.$$

A sheet of this aspect ratio can be cut into two smaller sheets each with the same aspect ratio. When Germany standardised paper sizes at the beginning of the 20th century, they used Lichtenberg's ratio, $\sqrt{2}:1$, to create the "A" series of paper sizes. Today these paper sizes are specified by ISO 216; size A0 is specified to have dimensions 1189 mm × 841 mm, with aspect ratio accurate to about a quarter of a millimeter.

=== Physical sciences ===
Distances between vertices of a double unit cube are square roots of the first six natural numbers. (√7 is not possible due to Legendre's three-square theorem.)

Diagram of decreasing apertures, that is, increasing f-numbers, in one-stop increments; each aperture has half the light-gathering area of the previous one.

There are some interesting properties involving the square root of 2 in the physical sciences:

- The square root of two is the frequency ratio of a tritone interval in twelve-tone equal temperament music.
- The square root of two forms the relationship of f-stops in photographic lenses, which in turn means that the ratio of areas between two successive apertures is 2.
- The celestial latitude (declination) of the Sun during a planet's astronomical cross-quarter day points equals the tilt of the planet's axis divided by $\sqrt{2}$.
- In the brain there are lattice cells, discovered in 2005 by a group led by May-Britt and Edvard Moser. "The grid cells were found in the cortical area located right next to the hippocampus [...] At one end of this cortical area the mesh size is small and at the other it is very large. However, the increase in mesh size is not left to chance, but increases by the squareroot of two from one area to the next."

== See also ==
- List of mathematical constants
- Square root of 3
- Square root of 5
- Square root of 8
- Gelfond–Schneider constant, 2^{√2}
- Silver ratio, 1 + √2
