= Square root of 3 =

Unique positive real number which when multiplied by itself gives 3

- The height of an equilateral triangle with sides of length 2 equals the square root of 3.

Representations
- Decimal: 1.7320508075688772935...
- Continued fraction: $1 + \cfrac{1}{1 + \cfrac{1}{2 + \cfrac{1}{1 + \cfrac{1}{2 + \cfrac{1}{1 + \ddots}}}}}$

The square root of 3 is the positive real number that, when multiplied by itself, gives the number 3. It is denoted mathematically as $\sqrt {3}$ or $3^{1/2}$. It is more precisely called the principal square root of 3 to distinguish it from the negative number with the same property. The square root of 3 is an irrational number. It is also known as Theodorus's constant, after Theodorus of Cyrene, who proved its irrationality.

In 2013, its numerical value in decimal notation was computed to ten billion digits. Its decimal expansion, written here to 60 decimal places, is given by OEIS: A002194:

1.732050807568877293527446341505872366942805253810380628055806

Archimedes reported a range for its value: $(\frac{1351}{780})^{2}>3>(\frac{265}{153})^{2}$.

The upper limit $\frac {1351}{780}$ is an accurate approximation for $\sqrt {3}$ to $\frac {1}{608,400}$ (six decimal places, relative error $3 \times 10^{-7}$) and the lower limit $\frac {265}{153}$ to $\frac {2}{23,409}$ (four decimal places, relative error $1\times 10^{-5}$).

== Rational approximations ==
The square root of 3 is an irrational number, meaning it can not be exactly represented as a fraction $x/y$ where $x$ and $y$ are integers. However, it can be approximated arbitrarily closely by such rational numbers.

Particularly good approximations are the integer solutions of Pell's equations,

$$x^2 - 3y^2 = 1$$

which can be algebraically rearranged into the form

$$\frac{x}{y} = \sqrt{3 + \frac{1}{y^2}} .$$

The first several solutions are given below:

$\boldsymbol n$	$1$	$2$	$3$	$4$	$5$	$6$	$7$	$8$	$9$	$\ldots$
$\frac{\boldsymbol{x_n}\vphantom{t} }{\boldsymbol {y_n} }$	$\frac{2}{1}$	$\frac{7}{4}$	$\frac{26}{15}$	$\frac{97}{56}$	$\frac{362}{209}$	$\frac{1351}{780}$	$\frac{5042}{2911}$	$\frac{18817}{10864}$	$\frac{70226}{40545}$	$\ldots$

(OEIS: A001075, OEIS: A001353)

These approximations also appear among the convergents of its continued fraction.

== Geometry and trigonometry ==
The height of an equilateral triangle with edge length 2 is √3. Also, the long leg of a 30-60-90 triangle with hypotenuse 2.

And, the height of a regular hexagon with sides of length 1

The space diagonal of the unit cube is √3.

The square root of 3 can be found as the leg length of an equilateral triangle that encompasses a circle with a diameter of 1.

If an equilateral triangle with sides of length 1 is cut into two equal halves, by bisecting an internal angle across to make a right angle with one side, the right angle triangle's hypotenuse is length one, and the sides are of length $\frac{1}{2}$ and $\frac{\sqrt{3}}{2}$. From this, $\tan{60^\circ}=\sqrt{3}$, $\sin{60^\circ}=\frac {\sqrt{3}}{2}$, and $\cos{30^\circ}=\frac {\sqrt{3}}{2}$.

The square root of 3 also appears in algebraic expressions for various other trigonometric constants, including the sines of other angles. For example, $\tan{15^\circ}=2-\sqrt{3}$ and $\tan{75^\circ}=2+\sqrt{3}$.

It is the distance between parallel sides of a regular hexagon with sides of length 1. It is also the length of the longest side of a triangle formed from two adjacent sides of a regular hexagon; following from the law of cosines:

$$\begin{align}
c^2 &= a^2 + b^2 - 2ab\cos\gamma, \\[3mu]
\end{align}$$

Since each angle of a regular hexagon is 120°, we can substitute 120° for $\gamma$ in the equation above.

$$\begin{align}
c^2 &= 1^2 + 1^2 - 2ab\cos 120^\circ \\
&= 1 + 1 - 2(-1/2) \\
&= 2 - (-1) \\
&= 3 \\
c = \sqrt 3
\end{align}$$

It is the length of the space diagonal of a unit cube.

The areas in blue – an equilateral triangle and a segment – form together a sector of one sixth of the circle (60°)

The vesica piscis has a major axis to minor axis ratio equal to $\sqrt{3}:1$. This can be shown by constructing two equilateral triangles within it.

== Applications ==
=== Electrical engineering ===
The square root of 3 plays a pivotal role in studies of three-phase electric power.
