= Single-precision floating-point format =

32-bit computer number format

Single-precision floating-point format (sometimes called FP32, float32, or float) is a computer number format, usually occupying 32 bits in computer memory; it represents a wide range of numeric values by using a floating radix point.

A floating-point variable can represent a wider range of numbers than a fixed-point variable of the same bit width at the cost of precision. A signed 32-bit integer variable has a maximum value of 2^{31} − 1 = 2,147,483,647, whereas an IEEE 754 32-bit base-2 floating-point variable has a maximum finite value of (2 − 2^{−23}) × 2^{127} ≈ 3.4028235 × 10^{38}. All integers with seven or fewer decimal digits, and any 2^{n} for a whole number −149 ≤ n ≤ 127, can be converted exactly into an IEEE 754 single-precision floating-point value.

In the IEEE 754 standard, the 32-bit base-2 format is officially referred to as binary32; it was called single in IEEE 754-1985. IEEE 754 specifies additional floating-point types, such as 64-bit base-2 double precision and, more recently, base-10 representations.

One of the first programming languages to provide single- and double-precision floating-point data types was Fortran. Before the widespread adoption of IEEE 754-1985, the representation and properties of floating-point data types depended on the computer manufacturer and computer model, and upon decisions made by programming-language designers. E.g., GW-BASIC's single-precision data type was the 32-bit MBF floating-point format.

Single precision is termed SINGLE-FLOAT in Common Lisp; float binary(p) with p≤21, float decimal(p) with the maximum value of p depending on whether the DFP (IEEE 754 DFP) attribute applies, in PL/I; float in C with IEEE 754 support, C++ (if it is in C), C# and Java; Float in Haskell and Swift; and Single in Object Pascal (Delphi), Visual Basic, and MATLAB. However, float in Python, Ruby, PHP, and OCaml and single in versions of Octave before 3.2 refer to double-precision numbers. In most implementations of PostScript, and some embedded systems, the only supported precision is single.

== IEEE 754 standard: binary32 ==
The IEEE 754 standard specifies a binary32 as having:

- Sign bit: 1 bit
- Exponent width: 8 bits
- Significand precision: 24 bits (23 explicitly stored)

This gives from 6 to 9 significant decimal digits precision. If a decimal string with at most 6 significant digits is converted to the IEEE 754 single-precision format, giving a normal number, and then converted back to a decimal string with the same number of digits, the final result should match the original string. If an IEEE 754 single-precision number is converted to a decimal string with at least 9 significant digits, and then converted back to single-precision representation, the final result must match the original number.

The sign bit determines the sign of the number, which is the sign of the significand as well. "1" stands for negative. The exponent field is an 8-bit unsigned integer from 0 to 255, in biased form: a value of 127 represents the actual exponent zero. Exponents range from −126 to +127 (thus 1 to 254 in the exponent field), because the biased exponent values 0 (all 0s) and 255 (all 1s) are reserved for special numbers (subnormal numbers, signed zeros, infinities, and NaNs).

The true significand of normal numbers includes 23 fraction bits to the right of the binary point and an implicit leading bit (to the left of the binary point) with value 1. Subnormal numbers and zeros (which are the floating-point numbers smaller in magnitude than the least positive normal number) are represented with the biased exponent value 0, giving the implicit leading bit the value 0. Thus only 23 fraction bits of the significand appear in the memory format, but the total precision is 24 bits (equivalent to log_{10}(2^{24}) ≈ 7.225 decimal digits) for normal values; subnormals have gracefully degrading precision down to 1 bit for the smallest non-zero value.

The bits are laid out as follows:

The real value assumed by a given 32-bit binary32 data with a given sign, biased exponent E (the 8-bit unsigned integer), and a 23-bit fraction is

$$(-1)^{b_{31}} \times 2^{(b_{30}b_{29} \dots b_{23})_2 - 127} \times (1.b_{22}b_{21} \dots b_0)_2$$,

which yields

$$\text{value} = (-1)^\text{sign} \times 2^{(E-127)} \times \left(1 + \sum_{i=1}^{23} b_{23-i} 2^{-i} \right).$$

In this example:

- $\text{sign} = b_{31} = 0$,
- $(-1)^\text{sign} = (-1)^{0} = +1 \in \{-1, +1\}$,
- $E = (b_{30}b_{29} \dots b_{23})_2 = \sum_{i=0}^{7} b_{23+i} 2^{+i} = 124 \in \{1, \ldots, (2^8 - 1) - 1\} = \{1, \ldots, 254 \}$,
- $2^{(E-127)} = 2^{124-127} = 2^{-3} \in \{2^{-126}, \ldots, 2^{127}\}$,
- $1.b_{22}b_{21}...b_{0} = 1 + \sum_{i=1}^{23} b_{23-i} 2^{-i} = 1 + 1\cdot 2^{-2} = 1.25 \in \{1, 1+2^{-23}, \ldots, 2-2^{-23}\} \subset [1; 2 - 2^{-23}] \subset [1; 2)$.

thus:

- $\text{value} = (+1) \times 2^{-3} \times 1.25 = +0.15625$.

Note:

- $1+2^{-23} \approx 1.000\,000\,119$,
- $2-2^{-23} \approx 1.999\,999\,881$,
- $2^{-126} \approx 1.175\,494\,35 \times 10^{-38}$,
- $2^{+127} \approx 1.701\,411\,83 \times 10^{+38}$.

=== Exponent encoding ===
The single-precision binary floating-point exponent is encoded using an offset-binary representation, with the zero offset being 127; also known as exponent bias in the IEEE 754 standard.

- E_{min} = 01_{H}−7F_{H} = −126
- E_{max} = FE_{H}−7F_{H} = 127
- Exponent bias = 7F_{H} = 127

Thus, in order to get the true exponent as defined by the offset-binary representation, the offset of 127 has to be subtracted from the stored exponent.

The stored exponents 00_{H} and FF_{H} are interpreted specially.

Exponent	fraction = 0	fraction ≠ 0	Equation
00_{H} = 00000000_{2}	±zero	subnormal number	$(-1)^\text{sign}\times2^{-126}\times0.\text{fraction}$
01_{H}, ..., FE_{H} = 00000001_{2}, ..., 11111110_{2}	normal value		$(-1)^\text{sign}\times2^{\text{exponent}-127}\times1.\text{fraction}$
FF_{H} = 11111111_{2}	±infinity	NaN (quiet, signaling)	

The minimum positive normal value is $2^{-126} \approx 1.18 \times 10^{-38}$ and the minimum positive (subnormal) value is $2^{-149} \approx 1.4 \times 10^{-45}$.

=== Converting decimal to binary32 ===
In general, refer to the IEEE 754 standard itself for the strict conversion (including the rounding behaviour) of a real number into its equivalent binary32 format.

Here we can show how to convert a base-10 real number into an IEEE 754 binary32 format using the following outline:

- Consider a real number with an integer and a fraction part such as 12.375
- Convert and normalize the integer part into binary
- Convert the fraction part using the following technique as shown here
- Add the two results and adjust them to produce a proper final conversion

Conversion of the fractional part: Consider 0.375, the fractional part of 12.375. To convert it into a binary fraction, multiply the fraction by 2, take the integer part and repeat with the new fraction by 2 until a fraction of zero is found or until the precision limit is reached which is 23 fraction digits for IEEE 754 binary32 format.

$0.375 \times 2 = 0.750 = 0 + 0.750 \Rightarrow b_{-1} = 0$, the integer part represents the binary fraction digit. Re-multiply 0.750 by 2 to proceed

$$0.750 \times 2 = 1.500 = 1 + 0.500 \Rightarrow b_{-2} = 1$$

$0.500 \times 2 = 1.000 = 1 + 0.000 \Rightarrow b_{-3} = 1$, fraction = 0.011, terminate

We see that $(0.375)_{10}$ can be exactly represented in binary as $(0.011)_2$. Not all decimal fractions can be represented in a finite digit binary fraction. For example, decimal 0.1 cannot be represented in binary exactly, only approximated. Therefore:

$$(12.375)_{10} = (12)_{10} + (0.375)_{10} = (1100)_2 + (0.011)_2 = (1100.011)_2$$

Since IEEE 754 binary32 format requires real values to be represented in $(1.x_1x_2...x_{23})_2 \times 2^{e}$ format (see Normalized number, Denormalized number), 1100.011 is shifted to the right by 3 digits to become $(1.100011)_2 \times 2^{3}$

Finally we can see that: $(12.375)_{10} = (1.100011)_2 \times 2^{3}$

From which we deduce:

- The exponent is 3 (and in the biased form it is therefore $(127+3)_{10} = (130)_{10} = (1000\ 0010)_{2}$)
- The fraction is 100011 (looking to the right of the binary point)

From these we can form the resulting 32-bit IEEE 754 binary32 format representation of 12.375:

$$(12.375)_{10} = (0\ 10000010\ 10001100000000000000000)_{2} = (41460000)_{16}$$

Note: consider converting 68.123 into IEEE 754 binary32 format: Using the above procedure you expect to get $(\text{42883EF9})_{16}$ with the last 4 bits being 1001. However, due to the default rounding behaviour of IEEE 754 format, what you get is $(\text{42883EFA})_{16}$, whose last 4 bits are 1010.

Example 1: Consider decimal 1. We can see that: $(1)_{10} =(1.0)_2 \times 2^{0}$

From which we deduce:

- The exponent is 0 (and in the biased form it is therefore $(127+0)_{10}=(127)_{10} = (0111\ 1111)_{2}$
- The fraction is 0 (looking to the right of the binary point in 1.0 is all $0 = 000...0$)

From these we can form the resulting 32-bit IEEE 754 binary32 format representation of real number 1:

$$(1)_{10} = (0\ 01111111\ 00000000000000000000000)_{2} = (\text{3F800000})_{16}$$

Example 2: Consider a value 0.25. We can see that: $(0.25)_{10} =(1.0)_2 \times 2^{-2}$

From which we deduce:

- The exponent is −2 (and in the biased form it is $(127+(-2))_{10} = (125)_{10} = (0111\ 1101)_{2}$)
- The fraction is 0 (looking to the right of binary point in 1.0 is all zeroes)

From these we can form the resulting 32-bit IEEE 754 binary32 format representation of real number 0.25:

$$(0.25)_{10} = (0\ 01111101\ 00000000000000000000000)_{2} = (\text{3E800000})_{16}$$

Example 3: Consider a value of 0.375. We saw that $0.375 = {(0.011)_2} = {(1.1)_2}\times 2^{-2}$

Hence after determining a representation of 0.375 as ${(1.1)_2}\times 2^{-2}$ we can proceed as above:

- The exponent is −2 (and in the biased form it is $(127+(-2))_{10} = (125)_{10} = (0111\ 1101)_{2}$)
- The fraction is 1 (looking to the right of binary point in 1.1 is a single $1 = x_1$)

From these we can form the resulting 32-bit IEEE 754 binary32 format representation of real number 0.375:

$$(0.375)_{10} = (0\ 01111101\ 10000000000000000000000)_{2} = (\text{3EC00000})_{16}$$

=== Converting binary32 to decimal ===
If the binary32 value, 41C80000 in this example, is in hexadecimal we first convert it to binary:

$$\text{41C8 0000}_{16} = 0100\ 0001\ 1100\ 1000\ 0000\ 0000\ 0000\ 0000_{2}$$

then we break it down into three parts: sign bit, exponent, and significand.

- Sign bit: $0_2$
- Exponent: $1000\ 0011_2 = 83_{16} = 131_{10}$
- Significand: $100\ 1000\ 0000\ 0000\ 0000\ 0000_2 = 480000_{16}$

We then add the implicit 24th bit to the significand:

- Significand: $\mathbf{1}100\ 1000\ 0000\ 0000\ 0000\ 0000_2 = \text{C80000}_{16}$

and decode the exponent value by subtracting 127:

- Raw exponent: $83_{16} = 131_{10}$
- Decoded exponent: $131 - 127 = 4$

Each of the 24 bits of the significand (including the implicit 24th bit), bit 23 to bit 0, represents a value, starting at 1 and halves for each bit, as follows:

bit 23 = 1
bit 22 = 0.5
bit 21 = 0.25
bit 20 = 0.125
bit 19 = 0.0625
bit 18 = 0.03125
bit 17 = 0.015625
.
.
bit 6 = 0.00000762939453125
bit 5 = 0.000003814697265625
bit 4 = 0.0000019073486328125
bit 3 = 0.00000095367431640625
bit 2 = 0.000000476837158203125
bit 1 = 0.0000002384185791015625
bit 0 = 0.00000011920928955078125

The significand in this example has three bits set: bit 23, bit 22, and bit 19. We can now decode the significand by adding the values represented by these bits.

- Decoded significand: $1 + 0.5 + 0.0625 = 1.5625 = \text{C80000}/2^{23}$

Then we need to multiply with the base, 2, to the power of the exponent, to get the final result:

$$1.5625 \times 2^4 = 25$$

Thus

$$\text{41C8 0000} = 25$$

This is equivalent to:

$$n = (-1)^s \times
(1+m*2^{-23})\times
2^{x - 127}$$

where s is the sign bit, x is the exponent, and m is the significand.

=== Precision limitations on decimal values (between 1 and 16777216) ===
- Decimals between 1 and 2: fixed interval 2^{−23} (1+2^{−23} is the next largest float after 1)
- Decimals between 2 and 4: fixed interval 2^{−22}
- Decimals between 4 and 8: fixed interval 2^{−21}
- ...
- Decimals between 2^{n} and 2^{n+1}: fixed interval 2^{n−23}
- ...
- Decimals between 2^{22}=4,194,304 and 2^{23}=8,388,608: fixed interval 2^{−1}=0.5
- Decimals between 2^{23}=8,388,608 and 2^{24}=16,777,216: fixed interval 2^{0}=1

=== Precision limitations on integer values ===
- Integers between -16,777,216 and 16,777,216 (including 0) can be exactly represented
- Integers between 2^{24}=16,777,216 and 2^{25}=33,554,432 round to a multiple of 2 (even number)
- Integers between 2^{25} and 2^{26} round to a multiple of 4
- ...
- Integers between 2^{n} and 2^{n+1} round to a multiple of 2^{n−23}
- ...
- Integers between 2^{127} and 2^{128} round to a multiple of 2^{104}
- Integers greater than or equal to 2^{128} are rounded to "infinity".

=== Notable single-precision cases ===
These examples are given in bit representation, in hexadecimal and binary, of the floating-point value. This includes the sign, (biased) exponent, and significand.

0 00000000 00000000000000000000001_{2} = 0000 0001_{16} = 2^{−126} × 2^{−23} = 2^{−149} ≈ 1.4012984643 × 10^{−45}
(smallest positive subnormal number)

0 00000000 11111111111111111111111_{2} = 007f ffff_{16} = 2^{−126} × (1 − 2^{−23}) ≈ 1.1754942107 × 10^{−38}
(largest subnormal number)

0 00000001 00000000000000000000000_{2} = 0080 0000_{16} = 2^{−126} ≈ 1.1754943508 × 10^{−38}
(smallest positive normal number)

0 11111110 11111111111111111111111_{2} = 7f7f ffff_{16} = 2^{127} × (2 − 2^{−23}) ≈ 3.4028234664 × 10^{38}
(largest normal number)

0 01111110 11111111111111111111111_{2} = 3f7f ffff_{16} = 1 − 2^{−24} ≈ 0.999999940395355225
(largest number less than one)

0 01111111 00000000000000000000000_{2} = 3f80 0000_{16} = 1 (one)

0 01111111 00000000000000000000001_{2} = 3f80 0001_{16} = 1 + 2^{−23} ≈ 1.00000011920928955
(smallest number larger than one)

1 10000000 00000000000000000000000_{2} = c000 0000_{16} = −2
0 00000000 00000000000000000000000_{2} = 0000 0000_{16} = 0
1 00000000 00000000000000000000000_{2} = 8000 0000_{16} = −0

0 11111111 00000000000000000000000_{2} = 7f80 0000_{16} = infinity
1 11111111 00000000000000000000000_{2} = ff80 0000_{16} = −infinity

0 01111101 01010101010101010101011_{2} = 3eaa aaab_{16} ≈ 0.333333343267440796 ≈ 1/3
0 10000000 10010010000111111011011_{2} = 4049 0fdb_{16} ≈ 3.14159274101257324 ≈ π (pi)

x 11111111 10000000000000000000001_{2} = ffc0 0001_{16} = qNaN (on x86 and ARM processors)
x 11111111 00000000000000000000001_{2} = ff80 0001_{16} = sNaN (on x86 and ARM processors)

By default, 1/3 rounds up, instead of down like double-precision, because of the even number of bits in the significand. The bits of 1/3 beyond the rounding point are 1010... which is more than 1/2 of a unit in the last place.

Encodings of qNaN and sNaN are not specified in IEEE 754 and implemented differently on different processors. The x86 family and the ARM family processors use the most significant bit of the significand field to indicate a quiet NaN. The (no longer sold or supported) PA-RISC processors use the bit to indicate a signaling NaN.

=== Optimizations ===
The design of floating-point format allows various optimisations, resulting from the easy generation of a base-2 logarithm approximation from an integer view of the raw bit pattern. Integer arithmetic and bit-shifting can yield an approximation to reciprocal square root (fast inverse square root), commonly required in computer graphics.

== See also ==
- ISO/IEC 10967, language independent arithmetic
- Double-precision floating-point format
- Primitive data type
- Numerical stability
- Scientific notation
