= Integer square root =

Greatest integer less than or equal to square root

In number theory, the integer square root (isqrt) of a non-negative integer n is the non-negative integer m which is the greatest integer less than or equal to the square root of n,
$$\operatorname{isqrt}(n) = \lfloor \sqrt n \rfloor.$$

For example, $\operatorname{isqrt}(27) = \lfloor \sqrt{27} \rfloor = \lfloor 5.19615242270663 ... \rfloor = 5.$

== Introductory remark ==
Let $y$ and $k$ be non-negative integers.

Algorithms that compute (the decimal representation of) $\sqrt y$ run forever on each input $y$ which is not a perfect square. (Note: The square roots of the perfect squares (e.g., 0, 1, 4, 9, 16) are integers. In all other cases, the square roots of positive integers are irrational numbers.)

Algorithms that compute $\lfloor \sqrt y \rfloor$ do not run forever, but are nevertheless capable of computing $\sqrt y$ up to any desired accuracy $k$.

Choose any $k$ and compute $\lfloor \sqrt {y \times 100^k} \rfloor$.

For example (setting $y = 2$):
$$\begin{align}
& k = 0: \lfloor \sqrt {2 \times 100^{0}} \rfloor = \lfloor \sqrt {2} \rfloor = 1 \\
& k = 1: \lfloor \sqrt {2 \times 100^{1}} \rfloor = \lfloor \sqrt {200} \rfloor = 14 \\
& k = 2: \lfloor \sqrt {2 \times 100^{2}} \rfloor = \lfloor \sqrt {20000} \rfloor = 141 \\
& k = 3: \lfloor \sqrt {2 \times 100^{3}} \rfloor = \lfloor \sqrt {2000000} \rfloor = 1414 \\
& \vdots \\
& k = 8: \lfloor \sqrt {2 \times 100^{8}} \rfloor = \lfloor \sqrt {20000000000000000} \rfloor = 141421356 \\
& \vdots \\
\end{align}$$

Compare the results with $\sqrt {2} = 1.41421356237309504880168872420969807856967187537694 ...$

It appears that the multiplication of the input by $100^k$ gives an accuracy of k decimal digits. (Note: It is no surprise that the repeated multiplication by 100 is a feature in Jarvis (2006))

To compute the (entire) decimal representation of $\sqrt y$, one can execute $\operatorname{isqrt}(y)$ an infinite number of times, increasing $y$ by a factor $100$ at each pass.

Assume that in the next program ($\operatorname{sqrtForever}$) the procedure $\operatorname{isqrt}(y)$ is already defined and — for the sake of the argument — that all variables can hold integers of unlimited magnitude.

Then $\operatorname{sqrtForever}(y)$ will print the entire decimal representation of $\sqrt y$. (Note: The fractional part of square roots of perfect squares is rendered as 000....)

import math                             # assume isqrt computation as given here

def sqrtForever(y: int):
    """ Print sqrt(y), without halting """
    result = math.isqrt(y)
    print(str(result) + ".", end="")    # print result, followed by a decimal point

    while True:                         # repeat forever ...
        y *= 100                        # theoretical example: overflow is ignored
        result = math.isqrt(y)
        print(str(result % 10), end="") # print last digit of result

The conclusion is that algorithms which compute isqrt() are computationally equivalent to algorithms which compute sqrt().

Another derivation of $\sqrt y$ from $\lfloor \sqrt y \rfloor$ is given in section Continued fraction of √c based on isqrt below.

== Basic algorithms ==
The integer square root of a non-negative integer $y$ can be defined as
$$\lfloor \sqrt y \rfloor = \max \{ x : x^2 \leq y < (x+1)^2, x \in \mathbb{N} \}$$

For example, $\operatorname{isqrt}(27) = \lfloor \sqrt{27} \rfloor = 5$ because $5^2 \leq 27 \text{ and } 27 < 6^2$.

Since $\operatorname{isqrt}$ is a computable function, its graph is Diophantine by the MRDP theorem. (Note: Davis, Martin (1973). "Hilbert's Tenth Problem is Unsolvable". American Mathematical Monthly. 80 (3): 235–236. doi:10.2307/2318447. ISSN 0002-9890. JSTOR 2318447. Zbl 0277.02008. Reprinted as an appendix in Davis, Martin (1982). Computability and Unsolvability (reprint ed.). Dover Publications. ISBN 978-0-486-61471-7.) This is easily made explicit: for non-negative integers $x$ and $y$, $x = \operatorname{isqrt}(y)$ holds if and only if there are non-negative integers $a$ and $b$ with
$$y = x^2 + a \quad \text{and} \quad a + b = 2x,$$
since the first equation expresses $x^2 \le y$ and, given the first, the second is equivalent to $y < (x+1)^2$. The two equations can be combined into the single Diophantine equation
$$(y - x^2 - a)^2 + (a + b - 2x)^2 = 0.$$
Here $a = y - x^2$ is the remainder, as returned by SqrtRem below. All unknowns are bounded by $2y$, so a solution can always be found by finite search; the ascending linear search below is such a search.

=== Algorithm using linear search ===
The following Python programs are straightforward implementations.

def isqrt(y: int) -> int:
    """
    Integer square root
    (linear search, ascending)
    """
	# initial underestimate, L <= isqrt(y)   
    L = 0
    while (L + 1) * (L + 1) <= y:
        L += 1

    return L

def isqrt(y: int) -> int:
    """
    Integer square root
    (linear search, descending)
    """
	# initial overestimate, isqrt(y) <= R   
    R = y
    while (R * R > y):
        R -= 1

    return R

=== Linear search using addition ===
In the program above (linear search, ascending) one can replace multiplication by addition, using the equivalence
$$(L+1)^2 = L^2 + 2L + 1 = L^2 + 1 + \sum_{i=1}^L 2.$$

def isqrt(y: int) -> int:
    """
    Integer square root
    (linear search, ascending) using addition
    """
    L = 0
    a = 1
    d = 3

    while a <= y:
        a = a + d
        d = d + 2
        L = L + 1

    return L

=== Algorithm using binary search ===
Linear search sequentially checks every value until it hits the smallest $x$ where $x^2 > y$.

A speed-up is achieved by using binary search instead.

def isqrt(y: int) -> int:
    """ Integer square root (binary search) """
    L = 0                   # lower bound of the square root
    R = y + 1               # upper bound of the square root

    while (L != R - 1):
        M = (L + R) // 2    # midpoint to test
        if (M * M <= y):
            L = M
        else:
            R = M

    return L

Numerical examples

- $\operatorname{isqrt}(0) = 0$, $\operatorname{isqrt}(1) = 1$.
- Using binary search the computation of $\operatorname{isqrt}(131072)$ converges to $362$ in $17$ iteration steps via the $[L,R]$ sequence

$$\begin{aligned} &[0,131073] \to [0,65536] \to [0,32768] \to [0,16384] \to [0,8192] \to [0,4096] \to [0,2048] \to [0,1024] \to [0,512] \\& \to [256,512] \to [256,384] \to [320,384] \to [352,384] \to [352,368] \to [360,368] \to [360,364] \to [362,364] \to [362,363] \end{aligned}$$

- The computation of $\operatorname{isqrt}(2000000)$ converges to $1414$ in $21$ steps via the $[L,R]$ sequence

$$\begin{aligned} & [0,2000001] \to [0,1000000] \to [0,500000] \to [0,250000] \to [0,125000] \to [0,62500] \to [0,31250] \to [0,15625] \\& \to [0,7812] \to [0,3906] \to [0,1953] \to [976,1953] \to [976,1464] \to [1220,1464] \to [1342,1464] \to [1403,1464] \\& \to [1403,1433] \to [1403,1418] \to [1410,1418] \to [1414,1418] \to [1414,1416] \to [1414,1415] \end{aligned}$$
Linear search (ascending, starting from $0$) needs 1414 steps.

== Algorithm using Newton's method ==
One way of calculating $\sqrt{n}$ and $\operatorname{isqrt}(n)$ is to use Heron's method, which is a special case of Newton's method, to find a solution for the equation $x^2 - n = 0$, giving the iterative formula
$$x_{k+1} = \frac{1}{2}\!\left(x_k + \frac{n}{x_k}\right), \quad k \ge 0, \quad x_0 > 0.$$

The sequence $\{x_k\}$ converges quadratically to $\sqrt{n}$ as $k\to\infty$. (Note: See Heron's method.)

=== Using only integer division ===
For computing $\lfloor \sqrt n \rfloor$ one can use the quotient of Euclidean division for both of the division operations. This has the advantage of only using integers for each intermediate value, thus making the use of floating point representations unnecessary.

Let $n > 0$ and initial guess $x_0 > 0$. Define the integer sequence:

$$x_{k+1} = \left\lfloor \frac{x_k + \left\lfloor n / x_k \right\rfloor}{2} \right\rfloor, \quad k = 0, 1, 2, \dots$$

=== Proof of convergence ===
By definition, the sequence $x_k$ consists entirely of positive integers. We must prove it eventually reaches $r=\lfloor \sqrt n \rfloor$.

In fact, we might as well assume $x_0 \geq r$. Indeed, given any $x_k > 0$ we have

$$\frac{r^2}{x_k}  - (2r-x_k) = \frac{(r-x_k)^2}{x_k} \geq 0$$

Thus, $\lfloor r^2/x_k \rfloor \geq 2r-x_k$ because $2r-x_k$ is an integer, so (noting $n \geq r^2$)

$$\lfloor n / x_k \rfloor \geq \lfloor r^2/ x_k \rfloor \geq  2r-x_k.$$

Therefore,

$$x_{k+1} \geq \left\lfloor \frac{x_k + 2r - x_k}{2} \right\rfloor = r.$$

That is, no matter the initial $x_0 > 0$, the next value $x_1$ is at least $r$.

We have the following monotonicity property:

- If $x_k \geq r+1 > \sqrt{n}$, then $n/x_k < x_k$, and so (using $\lfloor n / x_k \rfloor \le n / x_k$)

$$x_{k+1} = \left\lfloor \frac{x_k + \lfloor n / x_k \rfloor}{2} \right\rfloor \leq \frac{x_k + n / x_k}{2} < x_k$$.
That is, the sequence decreases.

Therefore, the sequence eventually reaches $r$: if $x_k > r$, it must strictly decrease but never go below $r$ by the first argument. Moreover, if $x_k = r$, a similar calculation to the above shows $r \leq x_{k+1} \leq r+1$, so the sequence either stabilizes at $r$ or oscillates between $r$ and $r+1$.

The oscillating case occurs precisely when $n = (r+1)^2 -1$, i.e. when $n+1$ is a perfect square, in which case $r+1 = \lceil\sqrt{n}\rceil$.

=== Example implementation ===
def isqrt(n: int, x0: int = 1) -> int:
    """
    isqrt via Newton-Heron iteration with specified initial guess. 
    Uses 2-cycle oscillation detection.

    Preconditions:
        n >= 0                    # isqrt(0) = 0
        x0 > 0, defaults to 1     # initial guess

    Output:
        isqrt(n)
    """
    assert n >= 0 and x0 > 0, "Invalid input"

	# isqrt(0) = 0; isqrt(1) = 1
    if n < 2: return n

    prev2 = -1   # x_{i-2}
    prev1 = x0   # x_{i-1}

    while True:
        x1 = (prev1 + n // prev1) // 2

        # Case 1: converged (steady value)
        if x1 == prev1:
            return x1

        # Case 2: oscillation (2-cycle)
        if x1 == prev2 and x1 != prev1:
            # We’re flipping between prev1 and prev2
            # Choose the smaller one (the true integer sqrt)
            return min(prev1, x1)

        # Move forward
        prev2, prev1 = prev1, x1

=== Numerical examples ===
The call isqrt(2000000) converges to $1414$ in 14 passes through while:

$$\begin{aligned} & 1000000 \to 500001 \to 250002 \to 125004 \to 62509 \to 31270 \to 15666 \to 7896 \to 4074 \to 2282 \\& \to 1579 \to 1422 \to 1414 \rightarrow 1414\end{aligned}$$.

One iteration is gained by setting x0 to $\lfloor n/2 \rfloor$ with the call isqrt(2000000, 1000000). Although Heron's method converges quadratically close to the solution, less than one bit precision per iteration is gained at the beginning. This means that the choice of the initial estimate is critical for the performance of the algorithm. (Note: Newton's method can be given as follows (with the initial guess set to $s$): def isqrt(s: int) -> int:     """isqrt via Newton/Heron iteration."""     L, R = 1, s     while L < R:         R = L + ((R - L) // 2)         L = s // R     return R Computations: $\operatorname{isqrt}(0) = 0$, $\operatorname{isqrt}(1) = 1$.; The computation of $\operatorname{isqrt}(2000000)$ consists in $13 \; [L,R]$ steps: $$\begin{aligned} &[1,2000000] \to [2,1000000] \to [3,500001] \\& \to [7,250002] \to [15,125004] \to [31,62509] \\& \to [63,31270] \to [127,15666] \to [253,7896] \\& \to [490,4074] \to [876,2282] \to [1266,1579] \\& \to [1406,1422] \to [1414,1414] \end{aligned}$$ One sees that the performance gain of Newton's method over binary search is due to the fact that $\lfloor \sqrt s \rfloor$ is approached simultaneously from Left and Right, whereas binary search adjusts only one side at each iteration.) When a fast computation for the integer part of the binary logarithm or for the bit-length is available (like e.g. n.bit_length() in Python), one should better start at
$$x_0 = 2^{\lfloor (\log_2 n) / 2 \rfloor + 1},$$
which is the least power of two bigger than $\sqrt n$. In the example of the integer square root of 2000000, $\lfloor \log_2 n \rfloor = 20$, $x_0 = 2^{11} = 2048$, and the resulting sequence is
$$2048 \rightarrow 1512 \rightarrow 1417 \rightarrow 1414 \rightarrow 1414.$$
In this case only four iteration steps are needed. This corresponds to the call isqrt(2000000, 2048).

=== Generalization to Nth roots ===
Newton's method may be applied to compute $\lfloor\sqrt[N]{n}\rfloor$ in a manner entirely analogous to the $N=2$ case. Using integer division, the sequence becomes

$$x_{k+1} = \left\lfloor \frac{(N-1)x_k + \lfloor n/x_k^{N-1}\rfloor}{N} \right\rfloor.$$

Starting with an initial integer guess $x_0 \geq \lfloor\sqrt[N]{n}\rfloor$, the sequence reaches $\lfloor\sqrt[N]{n}\rfloor$, and the root is calculated as $x_k$ for the first $k$ satisfying $x_{k+1} \geq x_k$. In fact, any initial guess $x_0 > 0$ may be chosen: a similar application of the AM-GM inequality (as in the $N=2$ case) proves that $x_1 \geq \lfloor\sqrt[N]{n}\rfloor$.

== Digit-by-digit algorithm ==
The traditional pen-and-paper algorithm for computing the square root $\sqrt{n}$ is based on working from higher digit places to lower, and as each new digit pick the largest that will still yield a square $\leq n$. If stopping after the one's place, the result computed will be the integer square root.

=== Using bitwise operations ===
If working in base 2, the choice of digit is simplified to that between 0 (the "small candidate") and 1 (the "large candidate"), and digit manipulations can be expressed in terms of binary shift operations. With * being multiplication, << being left shift, and >> being logical right shift, a recursive algorithm to find the integer square root of any natural number is:

def isqrt_recursive(n: int) -> int:
    assert n >= 0, "n must be a non-negative integer"
    if n < 2: return n

    # Recursive call:
    small_cand = isqrt_recursive(n >> 2) << 1 # same as 2 * isqrt(n // 4)
    large_cand = small_cand + 1
    if large_cand * large_cand > n: return small_cand
    else: return large_cand

Equivalent non-recursive program: (Note: The algorithm is explained in Square_root_algorithms#Binary numeral system (base 2))

def isqrt_iterative(x: int) -> int:
    """ Guy, Martin (1985). "Fast integer square root by Mr. Woo's abacus algorithm" """
    assert x >= 0, "x must be a non-negative integer"

    op = x; res = 0

    # note: i << 1 is 2 * i, i << 2 is 4 * i,
    #       i >> 1 is i // 2, and i >> 2 is i // 4...

    # "one" starts at the highest power of four <= x
    one = 1
    while one <= op: one <<= 2
    one >>= 2

    while one != 0:
        dltasqr = res + one
        if op >= dltasqr:
            op -= dltasqr
            res += one << 1
        res >>= 1
        one >>= 2

    return res

See Methods of computing square roots § Binary numeral system (base 2) for an example.

== Karatsuba square root algorithm ==
The Karatsuba square root algorithm applies the same divide-and-conquer principle as the Karatsuba multiplication algorithm to compute integer square roots. The method was formally analyzed by Paul Zimmermann (1999). It recursively splits the input number into high and low halves, computes the square root of the higher half, and then determines the lower half algebraically.

=== Algorithm ===
Paul Zimmermann (1999) gives the following algorithm.

$$\text{Algorithm } \text{SqrtRem}(n = a_3 b^3 + a_2 b^2 + a_1 b + a_0)$$
$$\text{Input: } 0 \le a_i < b, \text{ with } a_3 \ge b/4$$
$$\text{Output: } (s,r) \text{ such that } s^2 \le n = s^2 + r < (s + 1)^2$$
$$\qquad (s', r') \gets \text{SqrtRem}(a_3 b + a_2)$$
$$\qquad (q, u) \gets \text{DivRem}(r' b + a_1, 2 s')$$
$$\qquad s \gets s' b + q$$
$$\qquad r \gets u b + a_0 - q^2$$
$$\qquad \text{if } r < 0 \text{ then }$$
$$\qquad \qquad r \gets r + 2s - 1$$
$$\qquad \qquad s \gets s - 1$$
$$\qquad \text{return } (s,r)$$

Because only one recursive call is made per level, the total complexity remains $O(n)$ in the number of bits. Each level performs only linear-time arithmetic on half-size numbers.

=== Comparison with Karatsuba multiplication ===
Property	Karatsuba multiplication	Karatsuba-style square root
Recursive calls per level	3	1
Recurrence	$T(n)=3T(n/2)+O(n)$	$T(n)=T(n/2)+O(n)$
Asymptotic complexity	$O(n^{\log_2 3})\!\approx\!O(n^{1.585})$	$O(n)$
Key operation	Three partial multiplications and recombination	One recursive square root and algebraic correction

=== Use and history ===
The Karatsuba-style square root is mainly used for arbitrary-precision arithmetic on very large integers, where it combines efficiently with Burnikel–Ziegler division and Karatsuba multiplication. It was first analyzed formally by Paul Zimmermann (1999). Earlier practical work includes Martin Guy (1985), and recursive versions appear in Donald Knuth (1998). Modern GMP and MPIR libraries implement similar recursive techniques.

=== Implementation in Python ===
The Python program below implements Zimmermann’s algorithm. Given an integer $n \ge 0$, SqrtRem computes simultaneously its integer square root $s = \lfloor \sqrt{n} \rfloor$ and the corresponding remainder $r = n - s^2$. The choice of isqrt() is ad libitum.

def SqrtRem(n: int, word_bits: int = 32) -> tuple[int, int]:
    """
    Implementation based on Zimmermann's Karatsuba-style integer square root
    algorithm [Zimmermann, 1999]. It recursively splits the input n into "limbs"
    of size `word_bits` and combines partial results to compute the integer square root.

    Args:
        n (int): Non-negative integer to compute the square root of.
        word_bits (int, optional): Number of bits per "limb" or chunk
            used when recursively splitting n. Default is 32. Each
            limb represents a fixed-size part of n for the algorithm.

    Returns:
        tuple[int, int]: s = integer square root of n, r = remainder (n - s*s).

    Notes:
        The limb size controls recursion granularity. Larger word_bits
        reduces recursion depth but increases the size of subproblems;
        smaller word_bits increases recursion depth but works on smaller chunks.

    Reference:
        Zimmermann, P. (1999). "Karatsuba Square Root", Research report #3805, Inria.
        Archived: https://inria.hal.science/inria-00072854v1/file/RR-3805.pdf
    """
    if n < 0:
        raise ValueError("n must be non-negative")
    if n == 0:
        return 0, 0  # trivial case

    # Determine number of word-sized limbs (mimics “limb” splitting in Zimmermann)
    limblen = (n.bit_length() + word_bits - 1) // word_bits

    # Base case: single limb — compute directly
    if limblen <= 1:
        s = isqrt(n)  # any isqrt, e.g., math.isqrt or custom
        r = n - s*s
        return s, r

    # --- Step 1: Split n into high and low parts ---
    half_limbs = limblen // 2
    shift = half_limbs * word_bits
    hi = n >> shift              # high half, corresponds to a3*b + a2
    lo = n & ((1 << shift) - 1)  # low half, corresponds to a1*b + a0

    # --- Step 2: Recursive call on the high part ---
    s_high, r_high = SqrtRem(hi, word_bits)  # approximate sqrt of high half

    # --- Step 3: Recombine to approximate full sqrt ---
    quarter = shift // 2
    numerator = (r_high << quarter) | (lo >> quarter)   # simulate Zimmermann’s DivRem step
    denominator = s_high << 1                           # 2*s' term

    q = numerator // denominator if denominator else 0  # integer division
    s_candidate = (s_high << quarter) + q               # recombine high and low

    # --- Step 4: Verification and correction ---
    # Ensure remainder is non-negative and s*s <= n < (s+1)*(s+1)
    s = s_candidate
    r = n - s*s

    while r < 0:                 # overestimate correction
        s -= 1
        r = n - s*s
    while (s + 1)*(s + 1) <= n:  # underestimate correction
        s += 1
        r = n - s*s

    return s, r

Example usage

    for n in [(2**32) + 5, 12345678901234567890, (1 << 1512) - 1]:
        s, r = SqrtRem(n)
        print(f"SqrtRem({n}) = {s}, remainder = {r}")

Computation

SqrtRem(4294967301) = 65536, remainder = 5

SqrtRem(12345678901234567890) = 3513641828, remainder = 5763386306

SqrtRem(143665816004337822710282600285310394341474369045835074863414468709543787931907367746179403311452034095731304066234112071267510472464260955153084575408147254672957261763907982395337943906645864229014250227057207826232751957053220218983971305018634078800548055251973907806245884614087189937340865371691338441989956445051526543084039211962387469415699218979531585795574920384684004258007709014706216763392717018544247025174258411677231986785008489302218244095) = 379032737378102767370356320425415662904513187772631008578870126471203845870697482014374611530431269030880793627229265919475483409207718357286202948008100864063587640630090308972232735749901964068667724412528434753635948938919935, remainder = 758065474756205534740712640850831325809026375545262017157740252942407691741394964028749223060862538061761587254458531838950966818415436714572405896016201728127175281260180617944465471499803928137335448825056869507271897877839870

== In programming languages ==
Some programming languages dedicate an explicit operation to the integer square root calculation in addition to the general case or can be extended by libraries to this end.

Programming language	Example use	Version introduced
Chapel	BigInteger.sqrt(result, n); BigInteger.sqrtRem(result, remainder, n);	Unknown
Common Lisp	(isqrt n)	Unknown
Crystal	Math.isqrt(n)	1.2
Java	n.sqrt() (BigInteger only)	9
Julia	isqrt(n)	0.3
Maple	isqrt(n)	Unknown
PARI/GP	sqrtint(n)	1.35a (as isqrt) or before
PHP	sqrt($num)	4
Python	math.isqrt(n)	3.8
Racket	(integer-sqrt n) (integer-sqrt/remainder n)	Unknown
Ruby	Integer.sqrt(n)	2.5.0
Rust	n.isqrt() n.checked_isqrt()	1.84.0
SageMath	isqrt(n)	Unknown
Scheme	(exact-integer-sqrt n)	R^{6}RS
Tcl	isqrt($n)	8.5
Zig	std.math.sqrt(n)	Unknown

== Continued fraction of √c based on isqrt ==
The computation of the simple continued fraction of $\sqrt{c}$ can be carried out using only integer operations, with $\operatorname{isqrt}(c)$ serving as the initial term. The algorithm generates continued fraction expansion in canonical form.

Let $a_0 = \lfloor \sqrt{c} \rfloor$ be the integer square root of $c$.

If $c$ is a perfect square, the continued fraction terminates immediately:

$$\sqrt{c} = [a_0].$$

Otherwise, the continued fraction is periodic:

$$\sqrt{c} = [a_0; \overline{a_1, a_2, \dots, a_m}]$$,

where the overline indicates the repeating part.

The continued fraction can be obtained by the following recurrence, which uses only integer arithmetic:

$$m_{0} = 0, \quad d_{0} = 1, \quad a_{0} = \lfloor \sqrt{c} \rfloor.$$
For $k \geq 0$,
$$m_{k+1} = d_{k} a_{k} - m_{k}, \quad
d_{k+1} = \frac{c - m_{k+1}^{2}}{d_{k}}, \quad
a_{k+1} = \left\lfloor \frac{a_{0} + m_{k+1}}{d_{k+1}} \right\rfloor.$$

Since there are only finitely many possible triples $(m_{k}, d_{k}, a_{k})$, eventually one repeats, and from that point onward the continued fraction becomes periodic.

=== Implementation in Python ===
On input $c$, a non-negative integer, the following program computes the simple continued fraction of $\sqrt{c}$. The integer square root $\lfloor \sqrt{c} \rfloor$ is computed once. Only integer arithmetic is used. The program outputs $[a0, (a1, a2, ..., am)]$, where the second element is the periodic part.

def continued_fraction_sqrt(c: int) -> tuple[int, tuple[int, ...]]:
    """
    Compute the continued fraction of sqrt(c) using integer arithmetic.
    Returns [a0, (a1, a2, ..., am)] where the second element is the periodic part.
    For perfect squares, the period is empty.
    """
    a0 = isqrt(c)

    # Perfect square: return period empty
    if a0 * a0 == c:
        return (a0, ())

    m, d, a = 0, 1, a0
    period = []
    seen = set()

    while True:
        m_next = d * a - m
        d_next = (c - m_next * m_next) // d
        a_next = (a0 + m_next) // d_next

        if (m_next, d_next, a_next) in seen:
            break

        seen.add((m_next, d_next, a_next))
        period.append(a_next)
        m, d, a = m_next, d_next, a_next

    return (a0, tuple(period))

Example usage

    for c in list(range(0, 18)) + [114] + [4097280036]:
        cf = continued_fraction_sqrt(c)
        print(f"sqrt({c}): {cf}")

Output

Input (c)	Output (cf)	Continued fraction
0	[0]	$\sqrt{0} = 0$
1	[1]	$\sqrt{1} = 1$
2	[1; (2,)]	$\sqrt{2} = [1; \overline{2}]$
3	[1; (1, 2)]	$\sqrt{3} = [1; \overline{1,2}]$
4	[2]	$\sqrt{4} = 2$
5	[2; (4,)]	$\sqrt{5} = [2; \overline{4}]$
6	[2; (2, 4)]	$\sqrt{6} = [2; \overline{2,4}]$
7	[2; (1, 1, 1, 4)]	$\sqrt{7} = [2; \overline{1,1,1,4}]$
8	[2; (1, 4)]	$\sqrt{8} = [2; \overline{1,4}]$
9	[3]	$\sqrt{9} = 3$
10	[3; (6,)]	$\sqrt{10} = [3; \overline{6}]$
11	[3; (3, 6)]	$\sqrt{11} = [3; \overline{3,6}]$
12	[3; (2, 6)]	$\sqrt{12} = [3; \overline{2,6}]$
13	[3; (1, 1, 1, 1, 6)]	$\sqrt{13} = [3; \overline{1, 1, 1, 1, 6}]$
14	[3; (1, 2, 1, 6)]	$\sqrt{14} = [3; \overline{1, 2, 1, 6}]$
15	[3; (1, 6)]	$\sqrt{15} = [3; \overline{1,6}]$
16	[4]	$\sqrt{16} = 4$
17	[4; (8,)]	$\sqrt{17} = [4; \overline{8}]$
114	[10; (1, 2, 10, 2, 1, 20)]	$\sqrt{114} = [10; \overline{1,2,10,2,1,20}]$ (Note: See the example in the article Periodic continued fraction.)
4097280036	[64009; (1, 1999, 3, 4, 1, 499, 3, 1, 3, 3, 1, 124, ......, 3, 1, 3, 499, 1, 4, 3, 1999, 1, 128018)] period: 13,032 terms (Note: The continued fraction expansion of $\sqrt{4097280036}$ has a period of 13,032 terms. While Python is unable to display the entire sequence on screen due to its length, writing the output to a file completes successfully.)	

== See also ==
- Square root algorithms
- Periodic continued fraction
