= Normal number (computing) =

Number type in floating-point arithmetic

In computing, a normal number is a non-zero number in a floating-point representation which is within the balanced range supported by a given floating-point format: it is a floating point number that can be represented without leading zeros in its significand.

The magnitude of the smallest normal number in a format is given by:

$$b^{E_{\text{min}}}$$

where b is the base (radix) of the format (like common values 2 or 10, for binary and decimal number systems), and $E_{\text{min}}$ depends on the size and layout of the format.

Similarly, the magnitude of the largest normal number in a format is given by

$$b^{E_{\text{max}}}\cdot\left(b - b^{1-p}\right)$$

where p is the precision of the format in digits and $E_{\text{min}}$ is related to $E_{\text{max}}$ as:

$$E_{\text{min}}\, \overset{\Delta}{\equiv}\, 1 - E_{\text{max}} = \left(-E_{\text{max}}\right) + 1$$

In the IEEE 754 binary and decimal formats, b, p, $E_{\text{min}}$, and $E_{\text{max}}$ have the following values:

Smallest and Largest Normal Numbers for common numerical Formats
Format	$b$	$p$	$E_{\text{min}}$	$E_{\text{max}}$	Smallest Normal Number	Largest Normal Number
binary16	2	11	−14	15	$2^{-14} \equiv 0.00006103515625$	$2^{15}\cdot\left(2 - 2^{1-11}\right) \equiv 65504$
binary32	2	24	−126	127	$2^{-126} \equiv \frac{1}{2^{126}}$	$2^{127}\cdot\left(2 - 2^{1-24}\right)$
binary64	2	53	−1022	1023	$2^{-1022} \equiv \frac{1}{2^{1022}}$	$2^{1023}\cdot\left(2 - 2^{1-53}\right)$
binary128	2	113	−16382	16383	$2^{-16382} \equiv \frac{1}{2^{16382}}$	$2^{16383}\cdot\left(2 - 2^{1-113}\right)$
decimal32	10	7	−95	96	$10^{-95} \equiv \frac{1}{10^{95}}$	$10^{96}\cdot\left(10 - 10^{1-7}\right) \equiv 9.999999 \cdot 10^{96}$
decimal64	10	16	−383	384	$10^{-383} \equiv \frac{1}{10^{383}}$	$10^{384}\cdot\left(10 - 10^{1-16}\right)$
decimal128	10	34	−6143	6144	$10^{-6143} \equiv \frac{1}{10^{6143}}$	$10^{6144}\cdot\left(10 - 10^{1-34}\right)$

For example, in the smallest decimal format in the table (decimal32), the range of positive normal numbers is 10^{−95} through 9.999999 × 10^{96}.

Non-zero numbers smaller in magnitude than the smallest normal number are called subnormal numbers (or denormal numbers).

Zero is considered neither normal nor subnormal.

== See also ==
- Normalized number
- Half-precision floating-point format
- Single-precision floating-point format
- Double-precision floating-point format
