= Normalized number =

In applied mathematics, a number is normalized when it is written in scientific notation with one non-zero decimal digit before the decimal point. Thus, a real number, when written out in normalized scientific notation, is as follows:

$$\pm d_0 . d_1 d_2 d_3 \dots \times 10^n$$

where n is an integer, $d_0, d_1, d_2, d_3, \ldots,$ are the digits of the number in base 10, and $d_0$ is not zero. That is, its leading digit (i.e., leftmost) is not zero and is followed by the decimal point. Simply speaking, a number is normalized when it is written in the form of a × 10^{n} where 1 ≤ |a| < 10 without leading zeros in a. This is the standard form of scientific notation. An alternative style is to have the first non-zero digit after the decimal point.

== Examples ==
As examples, the number 918.082 in normalized form is

$$9.18082 \times 10^2,$$

while the number −0.00574012 in normalized form is

$$-5.74012 \times 10^{-3}.$$

Clearly, any non-zero real number can be normalized.

== Other bases ==
The same definition holds if the number is represented in another radix (that is, base of enumeration), rather than base 10.

In base b a normalized number will have the form

$$\pm d_0 . d_1 d_2 d_3 \dots \times b^n,$$

where again $d_0 \neq 0,$ and the digits, $d_0, d_1, d_2, d_3, \ldots,$ are integers between $0$ and $b - 1$.

In many computer systems, binary floating-point numbers are represented internally using this normalized form for their representations; for details, see normal number (computing). Although the point is described as floating, for a normalized floating-point number, its position is fixed, the movement being reflected in the different values of the power.

== See also ==
- Significand
- Normal number (computing)
