= Damascius =

6th-century Greek Neoplatonic philosopher

- Born: 462; Damascus
- Died: after 538; Alexandria

Damascius (/dəˈmæʃəs/; Ancient Greek: Δαμάσκιος; c. 462 – after 538) was the last scholarch of the Neoplatonic Athenian school. He was one of the Neoplatonic philosophers who left Athens after laws confirmed by emperor Justinian I forced the closure of the Athenian school in c. AD 529. After he left Athens, he may have sought refuge in the court of the Persian King Chrosroes, before being allowed back into the Byzantine Empire. His surviving works consist of three commentaries on the works of Plato, and a metaphysical text entitled Difficulties and Solutions Concerning the First Principles (Ἀπορίαι καὶ λύσεις περὶ τῶν πρώτων ἀρχῶν).

== Life ==
Much of what is known about Damascius's life comes from his semi-autobiographical work The Philosophical History, or Life of Isidore, and from a work called Vita Severi written by the 6th-century bishop and historian Zacharias Scholasticus. Damascius, as his name suggests, was born in Damascus in c. AD 462, and travelled to Alexandria in the 480s to study rhetoric at the coeducational school of the late 5th-century Alexandrian professor Horapollo, where students of different religions and philosophies studied together. Zacharias reports that there was a close relationship between the Neoplatonic communities of Athens and Alexandria, as Agapius of Athens and Severianus of Damascus, students of Proclus' Neoplatonic school in Athens, also studied in Neoplatonic schools in Alexandria. Damascius may have travelled to Athens shortly before Proclus died in AD 485, to teach rhetoric, and travelled back to Alexandria before 488.

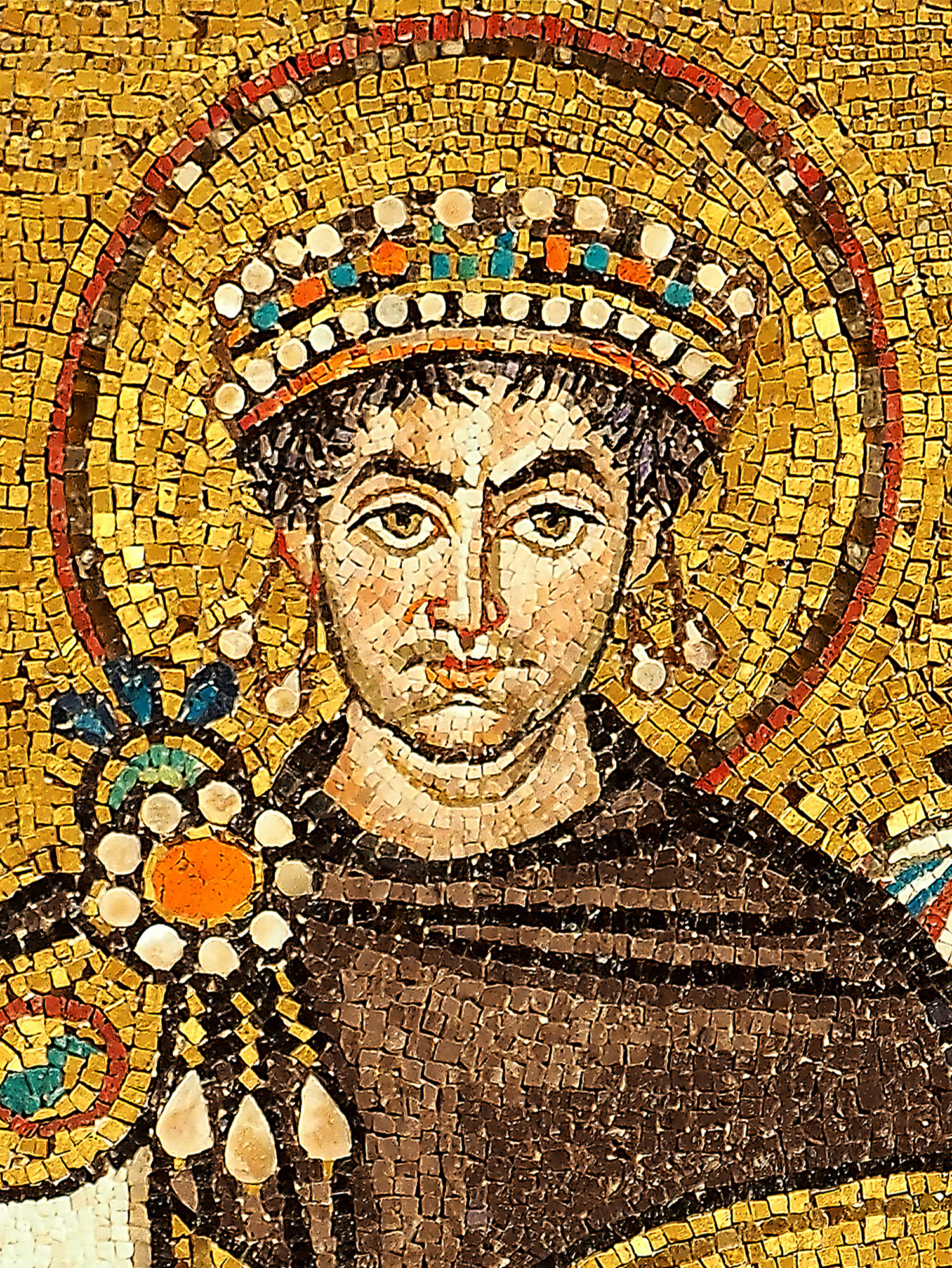
6th-century mosaic of Justinian I in the Basilique San Vitale in Ravenna, Italy. Damascius was head of the last Neoplatonic school in Athens when the laws of Justinian I forced its closure.

Late 5th-century Alexandria was a tumultuous place: there were conflicting factions of pro-Chalcedonian and Monophysite Christians, and a growing hostile sentiment towards Neoplatonists and people of other non-Christian religions and philosophies that sometimes led to rioting and arrests of leaders of non-Christian schools, resulting in students having to flee and go into hiding. Damascius's account of these times paints a picture of a circle of intellectuals that was under siege, facing arrest and interrogation. They were sometimes courageous, but at other times capitulated. Horapollo, the head of the school at which Damascius had studied and taught rhetoric for nine years, was arrested in AD 489, causing Damascius and the Neoplatonic philosopher Isidore of Alexandria to flee Alexandria and start on a journey to Athens with the aim of studying in the Neoplatonic school there.

That journey took eight months, and during that time Damascius writes that he lost interest in pursuing a profession as a rhetorician. When they finally arrived in Athens, Damascius and Isidore became students of the 5th-century Neoplatonist Marinus of Neapolis, Proclus's successor, at the Neoplatonic school of Athens. By AD 515, Damascius had become head of the Neoplatonic school in Athens, succeeding Marinus's successor Isidore. He continued Isidore's path of steering the school back to the philosophical studies of Aristotle, Plato, Orphic theogony and the Chaldean Oracles, and away from theurgy and rituals, which had previously been favoured, most likely due to the increasing external pressure on the school's philosophical teachings. Damascius was still the head of the school in AD 529, when the Byzantine emperor Justinian I confirmed his Codex Justinianus and administrators, enforcing the new laws, closed it down.

According to the 6th-century historian Agathias, soon after the school closed, Damascius, Isidore and the 6th-century Neoplatonic philosophers Simplicius of Cilicia, Eulamius of Phrygia, Priscianus of Lydia, Hermias and Diogenes of Phoenicia left Athens and travelled to Persia, where they had heard that the intellectual climate might be more suited to them, under the refuge of the Persian King Chosroes. It is not known if Damascius and his retinue of philosophers arrived in Persia, although late 20th- and early 21st-century scholarship by the French historian and philosopher Pierre Hadot, French scholar Michel Tardieu and German historian and philosopher Ilsetraut Hadot advanced the establishment of a Neoplatonic school in Charrae (present-day Harran, Turkey) in the Persian Empire, a view that is disputed by other 21st-century scholarship. The last known trace of Damascius is an epigram carved on a stele in Emesa, which confirms that Damascius returned to Syria in AD 538; this is also the year scholars say he died. Damascius composed a number of works, and a significant number of them survive fragmentarily, the more complete works being the literary work Life of Isidore, or Philosophical History, preserved by Photius, and the philosophical works Problems and Solutions Concerning First Principles, Commentary on the Parmenides, Commentary on the Phaedo, and Lectures on the Philebus.

== Writings ==
Damascius' Problems and Solutions Concerning First Principles is an intensely aporetic examination of late Neoplatonic metaphysics. Beginning from problems in Proclus' account of the One as transcendent cause, Damascius asks whether an absolutely transcendent principle can coherently be called a cause, a One, or indeed anything at all. He consequently distinguishes the causal One from an utterly Ineffable principle beyond it, while repeatedly questioning whether even this language is legitimate. The work then investigates the One, procession and reversion, henads, Being and the intelligible orders, critically comparing Plotinus, Iamblichus, Syrianus and Proclus and drawing extensively on Platonic, Pythagorean, Chaldean, Orphic and other theological traditions.

The rest of Damascius' writings are for the most part commentaries on works of Aristotle and Plato. Surviving commentaries include:

- Commentary on Plato's Parmenides.
- Commentary on Plato's Phaedo. This work has been erroneously ascribed to Olympiodorus of Alexandria.
- Commentary on Plato's Philebus. Also erroneously ascribed to Olympiodorus.

Lost or fragmentary works include:

- Commentaries on Plato's Timaeus, First Alcibiades, and other dialogues.
- Commentaries on Aristotle's De Caelo, and other works. The writings of Damascius on Time, Space, and Number, cited by Simplicius in his commentary on Aristotle's Physica, are perhaps parts of his commentaries on Aristotle's writings.
- Life of Isidore. Damascius's biography of his teacher Isidore (perhaps a part of the Philosophos Historia attributed to Damascius by the Suda), of which Photius preserved a considerable fragment. It is considered the source containing most details about the life of Ammonius Hermiae, and is also a primary source for the life of Hypatia. Incorporating material from both the Suda and Photius, a reconstructed text was translated into English by Polymnia Athanassiadi and published in 1999 as Damascius. The Philosophical History.
- Logoi Paradoxoi, in four books, of which Photius gives an account and specifies the respective titles of the books.

=== Damascius and the Corpus Dionysiacum ===
In an article published in 2006, Byzantine philologist Carlo Maria Mazzucchi argued that Damascius was the author of the Pseudo-Dionysian corpus, which should thus be regarded as the "last counter-offensive of Paganism" (l'ultima controffensiva del paganesimo). Mazzucchi's theory, which faced some criticism, was later improved with more arguments.

== See also ==
- Ammonius Saccas
- Azone
- Decline of Greco-Roman polytheism
- Iamblichus
- Olympiodorus the Younger
- Plotinus
- Theodora of Emesa

== Sources ==
- Damascius' Problems and Solutions Concerning First Principles. Translated by Ahbel-Rappe, Sara. New York: Oxford University Press, Inc. 2010. ISBN 9780195150292.
- Sara Ahbel-Rappe, Scepticism in the sixth century? Damascius' 'Doubts and Solutions Concerning First Principles,' Journal of the History of Philosophy 36 (1998), pp. 337–363.
- Damascio Intorno ai principi primi - Aporie e soluzioni, Translated by Ottobrini, Tiziano F., Brescia: Editrice Morcelliana, 2022.
- Polymnia Athanassiadi, Persecution and Response in late Paganism. The evidence of Damascius. In: Journal of Hellenic Studies 113 (1993), pp. 1–29.
- Polymnia Athanassiadi (editor and translator), Damascius. The Philosophical History. Athens: Apamea Cultural Association, 1999.
- Cosmin Andron, Damascius on Knowledge and its Object. In: Rhizai 1 (2004) pp. 107–124
- Sebastian R. P. Gertz, Death and Immortality in Late Neoplatonism: Studies on the Ancient Commentaries on Plato's Phaedo, Leiden: Brill, 2011.
- Sebastian R. P. Gertz, "From 'Immortal' to 'Imperishable': Damascius on the Final Argument in Plato's Phaedo". In: Ancient Readings of Plato's Phaedo (Leiden: 2015), 240–55.
- Golitsis, Pantelis (2023). Damascius' philosophy of time. Berlin Boston: De Gruyter. ISBN 9783111053189.
- Raban von Haehling, Damascius und die heidnische Opposition im 5. Jahrhundert nach Christus. In: Jahrbuch für Antike und Christentum 23 (1980), pp. 82–85.
- Udo Hartmann, Geist im Exil. Römische Philosophen am Hof der Sasaniden. In: Udo Hartmann/Andreas Luther/Monika Schuol (eds.), Grenzüberschreitungen. Formen des Kontakts zwischen Orient und Okzident im Altertum. Stuttgart 2002, pp. 123–160.
- Hartmann, Udo (2018). Der spätantike Philosoph. Die Lebenswelten der paganen Gelehrten und ihre hagiographische Ausgestaltung in den Philosophenviten von Porphyrios bis Damaskios (in German). Bonn: Habelt. pp. 246–354. ISBN 978-3-7749-4172-4.
- Androniki Kalogiratou, The Portrayal of Socrates by Damascius. In: Phronimon: Journal of the South African Society for Greek Philosophy and the Humanities 7 (1) 2006, pp. 45–54.
- Androniki Kalogiratou, Theology in Philosophy: The Case of the Late Antique Neoplatonist Damascius. In Skepsis: A Journal for Philosophy and Interdisciplinary Research XVIII, i-ii, 2007, pp. 58–79.
- Robert Lamberton, "Damascius. The Philosophical History" (book review), Bryn Mawr Classical Review, January 1, 2000.
- Remes, Pauliina; Slaveva-Griffin, Svetla, eds. (2014). The Routledge Handbook of Neoplatonism (in English and Ancient Greek). H. Tarrant, R. Sorabji, G. Reydams-Schils, F. Ferrari, J. D. Turner, V. Adluri, H. Baltussen, A. Smith, L. Brisson, M. Martijn, S. Ahbel-Rappe, J. Halfwassen, C. O’Brien, T. Arnold, T. Ratzsch, S. Slaveva-Griffin, R. Chiaradonna, J-M. Narbonne, R. M. Berg, L. P. Gerson, J. F. Finamore, F. M. Schroeder, G. Aubry, P. Lautner, A. Linguiti, J. Wilberding, K. Corrigan, S. Stern-Gillet, B. Collette-Dučić, P. Adamson, P. Remes, D. J. O’Meara, P. Vassilopoulou, D. Moran, D. Y. Dimitrov, S. Pessin. Oxford; New York: Routledge. ISBN 9781315744186.
- On the Eternity of the World, De Aeternitate Mundi, Proclus (in English and Ancient Greek). Translated by Lang, Helen S.; Macro, A. D.; McGinnis, Jon. Berkeley; Los Angeles; London: University of California Press. 2001. ISBN 0520225546.
- Remes, Pauliina (2008). Neoplatonism. Stocksfield, United Kingdom: Acumen Publishing Limited. ISBN 9781844651252.
- John R. Martindale, John Morris, The Prosopography of the Later Roman Empire II. Cambridge 1980, pp. 342f.
- Carlo Maria Mazzucchi, Damascio, Autore del Corpus Dionysiacum, e il dialogo Περι Πολιτικης Επιστημης. In: Aevum: Rassegna di scienze storiche linguistiche e filologiche 80, Nº 2 (2006), pp. 299–334.
- Carlo Maria Mazzucchi, Iterum de Damascio Areopagita. In: Aevum: Rassegna di scienze storiche linguistiche e filologiche 87, Nº 1 (2013), pp. 249–265.
- Smith, William, ed. (1870). Dictionary of Greek and Roman Biography and Mythology. Vol. 2. Boston: Little, Brown, and Company. p. 667. ark:/13960/t9f47mp93.
- Marilena Vlad, Damascius et l'ineffable. Récit de l'impossible discours (Paris, Vrin, 2019)
