= Theodora of Emesa =

5th–6th-century Neoplatonist based in Alexandria

Theodora of Emesa was a member of an intellectual group of neoplatonists in late fifth and early sixth century Alexandria, and a disciple of Isidore. Damascius dedicated his Life of Isidore, also known as the Philosophical History, to Theodora, having written it at her request.

== Biography ==
The daughter of Kyrina and Diogenes, Theodora was, like Iamblichus, descended from the royal line of Emesa.

The Athenian neoplatonic school had developed a following among Syrian and Egyptian pagan students at the turn of the fifth century, and Theodora, along with her younger sisters, had studied philosophy at the school of Isidore in Alexandria. This could have been in the 480s when Isidore was already well established within the intellectual Alexandrian milieu, or in the 490s after his return from Athens. She was also accomplished at poetics and grammar, a mathematician versed in geometry and higher arithmetic.

She was a neoplatonist of the Iamblichean type, so a devout pagan. According to Photius, writing three centuries later, she performed pagan rites and theurgical operations: he describes her as a ‘Hellene by religious persuasion,’ and her ancestors as ‘all of them first prize winners in idolatrous impropriety.’

Damascius's Life of Isidore illustrates the ease with which the philosophical circle to which Theodora belonged moved in the late fifth and early sixth centuries between Athens, Alexandria and Aphrodisias.

There is no record of Theodora fleeing to Persia after Justinian’s order to close the Platonic school in Athens in 529, along with Isidore, Damascius, Simplicius, Priscianus Lydus, Eulamius of Phrygia, Hermias the Phoenician, and Diogenes the Phoenician.

== The Life of Isidore ==
Theodora was also taught by Damascius, who was another disciple of Isidore and the last head of the neoplatonic school in Athens. It was at Theodora’s request that Damascius wrote the Life of Isidore, and to her that he dedicated it. This work, also known as the Philosophical History, was composed between 517-526, and provides an account of the lives and times of the pagan neoplatonic communities in Alexandria and Athens at the very end of antiquity, structured around the biography of Isidore.

All that are left of its 60 chapters are excerpts, preserved in Photius’s Bibliotheca and Suda, which, generally regarded as the revised version of notes that he had made in the course of his reading over the previous 20 years, are not necessarily accurate transcripts. Photius remarks that Damascius ‘does not so much write the life of Isidore, as that of many other people, both his contemporaries and his predecessors; he collects together their activities and also tales about them through a generous and even excessive use of digression’.

Polymnia Athanadassi describes the work as ‘a critical, often humorous, appreciation of the character and achievement of individual men and women… Set firmly against a wide geographical, historical and political background, these people are shown to move in two disparate and often clashing worlds, those of paganism and Christianity.’ But Edward Watts claims that ‘Ancient philosophical culture was not defined exclusively by religious concerns and doctrinal ties… Platonists shaped themselves into an intellectual community held together by doctrinal commonalities, a shared history, and defined personal relationships.’

== See also ==
- Emesan dynasty
