= Philebus =

Work by the ancient Greek philosopher Plato

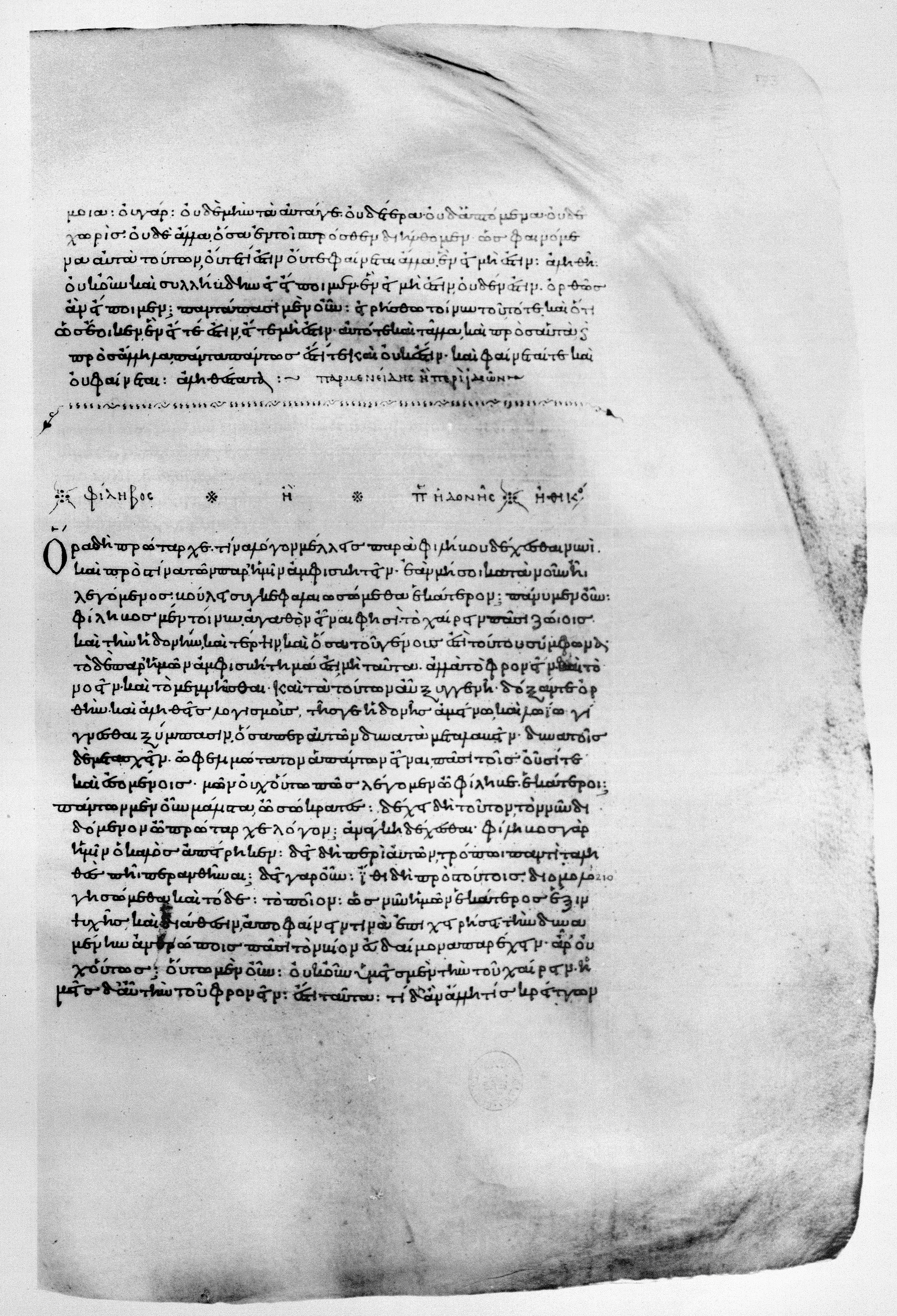
The beginning of Philebus in the oldest surviving medieval manuscript, the Codex Clarkianus written in 895 (Oxford, Bodleian Library, Clarke 39)

The Philebus (Φίληβος, Phílēbos) is a work by the ancient Greek philosopher Plato. Written in dialogue form, it presents a fictional conversation between Plato's teacher Socrates and two young Athenians, Philebus and Protarchus. The main topic is the ethical evaluation of pleasure.

Philebus and Protarchus are hedonists who consider pleasure as the highest good and equate it with the absolute Good. Socrates represents the opposing view, prioritizing reason and insight. While he does not dispute the legitimacy and value of pleasure, he points out the diversity of pleasures and argues for a more nuanced assessment. He rejects some forms of pleasure as harmful and assigns a subordinate rank in the hierarchical value order to the remaining "pure" pleasures. The distinction between types of pleasure leads to general considerations about the unity and plurality of types that are subsumed under a generic term, and about the categories into which all being can be divided. Socrates explores the causes, origins, and characteristics of various forms and mixtures of pleasure and pain that occur in human life and their changing combinations, which result in diverse emotional states. The specifics of each form of pleasure are analyzed, and the reasons for their varying evaluations are explained. At the end of the dialogue, Socrates presents a universal value order. In this, proper measure, proportionality, takes the highest place, and pleasure – as far as it is justified – takes the lowest. Harmful pleasures are to be avoided. The right mixture of desired factors is supposed to enable a successful life and bring about a balanced emotional state. Protarchus agrees, while Philebus no longer comments.

The Philebus is considered one of Plato's most challenging dialogues. Manuscripts of the work give it the subtitle "peri hēdonēs, ēthikos" ("ethics/moral concerning pleasure") implying that its topic is "concerning pleasure" and it is a work on ethics — that is, the question of what way of life is best. However, in addition to the core theme of pleasure, it discusses a range of other philosophical questions; "there are large parts in the dialogue that deal with dialectics and ontology but have nothing to do with pleasure and ethics, or if so, only indirectly". In modern research, the classification of all being into four classes by Socrates and the relationship of this classification to Plato's Theory of Forms and to his "unwritten doctrines" receive particular focus.

== Composition ==
Research is almost unanimous in classifying Philebus among Plato's "late" dialogues. It has been proposed that the work was composed between 360 and 347 BC, and that it is among the last of the late dialogues of Plato. This is supported both by statistical linguistic evidence and the content's similarity to other late works, especially the Timaeus. However, the prominent role of the character Socrates in this late work is atypical; many of the other "late" dialogues do not figure Socrates as the main speaking character. Some prefer a slightly earlier dating – originating in the last phase of Plato's middle period. For a more precise placement within the group of late dialogues, there is a lack of sufficient evidence. (Note: For an early dating, see: Waterfield 1980a, pp. 270–305; Ledger 1989, pp. 198f; Thesleff 2009, pp. 344–346) The hypothesis that Philebus was Plato's response to the hedonism of Eudoxus of Cnidus has led to the suggestion that the composition dates soon after 360 BC, though this attribution is highly uncertain.

The textual transmission of Philebus is more problematic than that of other dialogues due to some corruptions, posing special challenges for textual criticism. The oldest surviving medieval manuscript of Philebus was produced in the year 895 in the Byzantine Empire for Arethas of Caesarea, while older manuscripts are limited to a few small papyrus fragments.

== Place, time, and participants ==
Unlike many other Platonic dialogues such as the Phaedo or the Theaetetus, Philebus is not structured as a reported narrative from someone who had heard the conversation, rather, the dialogue begins abruptly, without any framing action. Nothing is revealed about the place, time, and occasion of the conversation. Athens, the hometown of Socrates, is the only possible setting. In addition to the three interlocutors Socrates, Protarchus, and Philebus, a group of young men is also present, who only listen silently. They are apparently admirers of Philebus, whose homoerotic beauty is valued. (Note: Plato, Philebus 16a–b) Although the dialogue is named after him, Philebus plays only a minor role. The debate takes place between Socrates and Protarchus.

=== Socrates ===
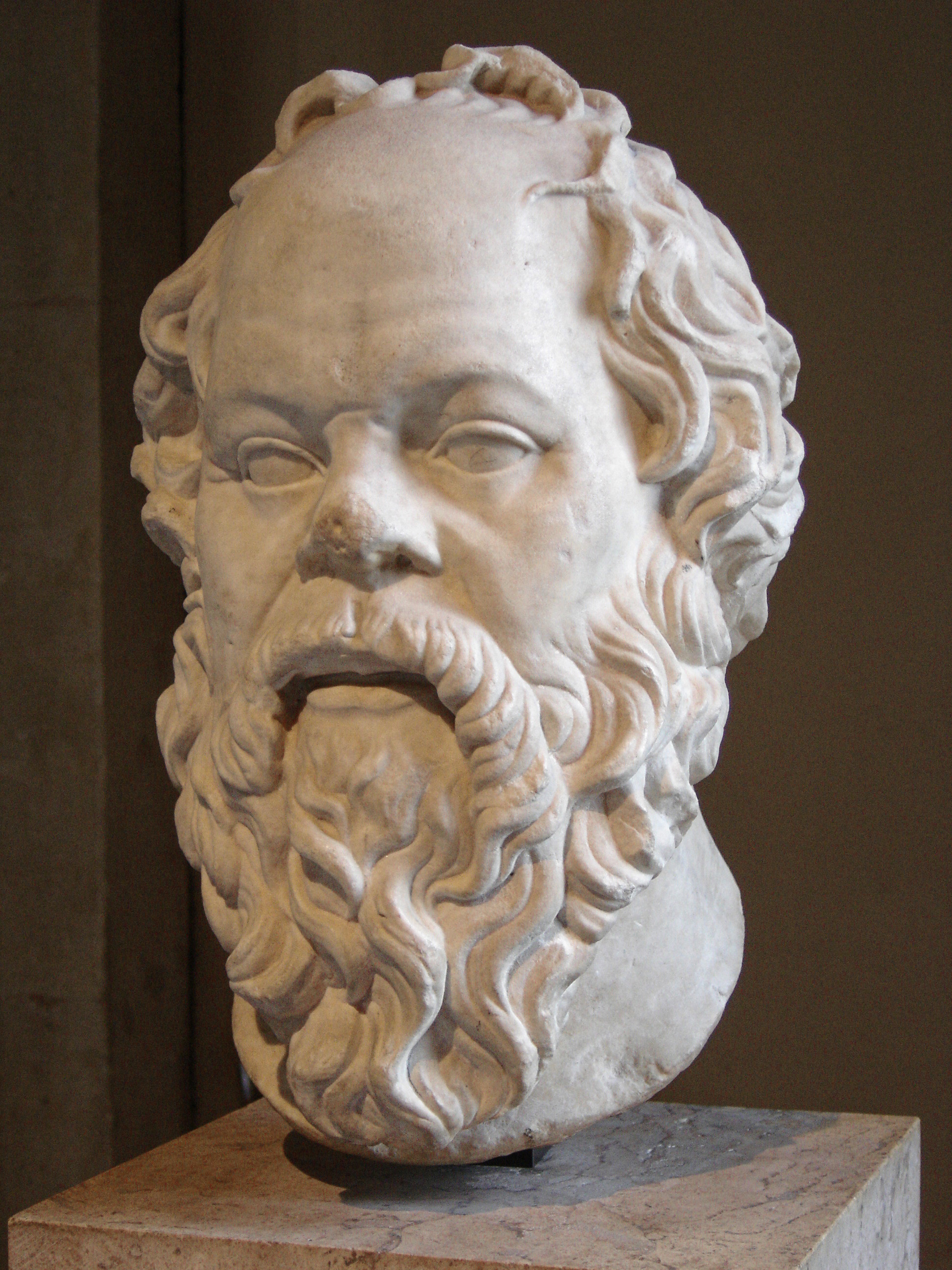
Socrates (Roman bust, 1st century, Louvre, Paris)

Socrates, as in most Platonic dialogues, is the main character, the knowledgeable philosopher who leads and dominates the debate and helps the others gain insights. Unlike in the early dialogues, where he holds back his own opinion and leads his interlocutors to new thoughts with purposeful questions, here he develops his own theory. Since the dialogue is a fictional literary construct, the concept that Plato puts in Socrates' mouth should not necessarily be regarded as the position of the historical Socrates, although some scholars have noted that the ethical attitude of the dialogue character roughly corresponds to that of his real-life model.

=== Philebus ===
Philebus is young, more a teenager than a young man. His beauty is repeatedly emphasized. (Note: Plato, Philebus 11c, 26b) His special relationship with the goddess of love Aphrodite, to whom he gives the name of pleasure (Hedone), apparently reflects his view that his commitment to hedonism is in line with the goddess. (Note: Plato, Philebus 12b, 22c)

It is notable that Philebus, while being the title character and putting forward the initial thesis, leaves the defense of the thesis to Protarchus, while he himself rests and listens. He rarely speaks, and at the end, he silently accepts the refutation of his thesis. He is lazy, interested only in enjoyment, and shies away from the mental effort of a debate. His worldview is simple. His appearance and entire demeanor match the negative image of an incompetent, self-satisfied, and unteachable hedonist that the author wants to present to the reader. Friedländer suggests that Philebus does not participate in the philosophical investigation because he embodies an irrational principle that does not give an account of itself.

There is no evidence outside the dialogue for the existence of a historical acquaintance of Socrates named Philebus. It is quite possible that he is a purely fictional character. This is suggested by the fact that no historical bearer of this name is known, and it is a nickname that fits the character ("youth lover" or "friend of youthful pleasure"). Further indicators of fictionality are that the name of his father is not mentioned, and Plato has not given him a profile that would allow for historical classification.

It is possible that Plato attributed features of the mathematician and philosopher Eudoxus of Cnidus to Philebus. Eudoxus, a younger contemporary of Plato, was a hedonist, and the critique of hedonism in Philebus was, according to a research hypothesis, directed against his doctrine.Plato's examination of pleasure; (The Philebus) by Hackforth, R. (Reginald), 1887-1957, tr

=== Protarchus ===
As a dialogue character, Protarchus, like Philebus, represents the Athenian upper class, in which educational efforts were valued and philosophical topics sparked interest during the time of Socrates. In contrast to Philebus, Protarchus proves to be willing to learn and flexible. He is modest and open to subjecting his hedonistic worldview to an unbiased examination, whereas Philebus declares from the beginning that he will not change his opinion. Eventually, Protarchus is convinced by Socrates, after having tried to defend his position for some time.

Protarchus is considered by some scholars as more likely to be a historical person than Philebus, though doubts still exist. In the dialogue, Socrates calls him "son of Callias". (Note: Plato, Philebus 19b.) Dorothea Frede believes that Protarchus was one of the two sons of the wealthy Athenian known in the scholarly literature as "Callias III" who are mentioned in Plato's Apology. (Note: Plato, Apology 20a–c;) They were, according to Plato's statements there, taught by the Sophist Euenus of Paros. In Philebus, Protarchus speaks respectfully of the famous rhetoric teacher Gorgias and identifies himself as his eager student. (Note: Plato, Philebus 58a–b.) It is also possible that Plato's Protarchus is identifiable with an author – apparently a Rhetorician – of the same name cited by Aristotle. (Note: Aristotle, Physics 197b)

== Content ==
Philebus is considered challenging and difficult to understand. As early as 1809, the influential Plato translator Friedrich Schleiermacher noted in the introduction to the first edition of his translation: “This dialogue has always been considered one of the most important, but also one of the hardest among the works of Plato.” However, recent research has emphasized the well thought-out structure of the Philebus, including the doctrine of affect and the approach to a theory of comedy.

Reference numbers are given in Stephanus pagination; the dialogue runs from page 11a-67b.

=== Developing the preconditions (11a-31b) ===
==== Initial situation (11a-12b) ====
The dialogue starts abruptly in the middle of ongoing conversation. Philebus has posited that pleasure or delight (hēdonḗ) is equivalent to "the good" and desirable for all living beings. Pleasure leads to the state of Eudaimonia ("happiness") and thus brings about a successful life. Socrates has disputed this and argued for the counter-thesis that there are more important and advantageous things: reason, knowledge, and memory, a correct understanding, and truthful deliberation. This debate has made Philebus weary, so he now leaves it to Protarchus to defend their common standpoint against Socrates' critique. Protarchus, however wishes to discuss the matter with an open mind, whereas Philebus outright states that he will always hold on to the precedence of pleasure. (Note: Plato, Philebus 11a–12b)

==== Pleasure and pleasures (12c-14b) ====
Socrates begins his critique of the glorification of pleasure by noting that pleasure is not a simple, uniform entity. Rather, there are diverse and even disparate phenomena that are grouped under this term. The pleasure of a profligate person is not comparable to that of a prudent one, and the pleasure of a reasonable person is not comparable to that of a fool. Protarchus counters that although the causes of pleasant feelings are opposites, the effect is always the same. He argues that pleasure is always pleasure and always good. To counter this, Socrates makes a comparison with the concept of "color": both black and white are colors, yet one is the exact opposite of the other. Similarly, there are opposing pleasures; some are bad, others good. Protarchus initially does not concede this; only when Socrates also describes his favored good, knowledge, as diverse, does Protarchus admit to the variety of pleasures, as his position is not disadvantaged by this view. (Note: Plato, Philebus 12c–14b)

==== One and many (14b-17a) ====
The general problem that the conversationalists have encountered is the relationship between one and many, one of the core themes of Platonic philosophy, which questions how it is possible that pleasures or reason can both consist of different kinds but yet still form a unity that justifies the common concept. This is not about the specific instances of each concept, but about the general class of experiences that underlies them, i.e., concepts like "human," "the beautiful," or "the good" and their subdivisions. (Note: Plato Philebus 14c–15a)

In the Platonic Theory of Forms, to which Socrates potentially alludes here, such concepts are regarded as "Platonic forms," that is, as independently existing, unchanging metaphysical entities. The forms are causative powers, they evoke in the visible world the phenomena corresponding to them. However, a fundamental problem of this Platonic model emerges: on the one hand, the individual forms are regarded as separate, unified, immutable entities, thus strictly distinct from each other as well as from the sensually perceivable appearances; on the other hand, they are still closely connected to the realm of sensory objects and are somehow present there, for they cause the existence and nature of everything that arises and perishes there. The Platonic form is a stable, delimited unity and appears simultaneously as a limitless multiplicity, uniting opposites, which appears to be paradoxical. (Note: Plato, Philebus 15a–16c)

==== Music and letters (17a-20b) ====
Socrates then illustrates the concept of One and Many using examples. "Speech sound" and "tone" are general terms that encompass an unlimited variety of individual acoustic phenomena. Language consists of sounds, music of tones. Anyone who only knows the general concepts of "sound" and "tone" and the existence of a multitude of corresponding individual phenomena still possesses no useful knowledge. One is only linguistically or musically competent if one knows the number and types of relevant sounds or tones, i.e., can fully and correctly classify the individual elements of the respective set. To this end, one starts from the most general overarching concept, the category of "Linguistic utterance" or "tone". One determines what subcategories this category consists of and how these in turn are divided into types and subtypes. Thus, one progresses from the general to the specific and captures the structure of the relevant field of knowledge. In the field of linguistic sounds, for example, it turns out that they divide into consonants and vowels. Among consonants, voiceless and voiced are to be distinguished, and the voiceless ones in turn have two subtypes. At the lowest level, one then reaches the individual sounds that are not further divisible. One finds out how many of them there are and to which classes they each belong. Similarly, one must proceed with the overarching concepts of "pleasure" and "insight" (or "reason") if one wants to become knowledgeable. This system of methodically carried out concept classification is today known under the designation diairesis.

==== Classification of pleasure and reason into a system (20b-31b) ====
However, Socrates first brings up another consideration, with which he returns to the initial question of the ranking of goods. He suggests examining the possibility that neither pleasure nor reason is the highest good, but rather a third thing that is superior to both. The highest good can only be "the Good", the absolute Good, which is surpassed by nothing and lacks nothing for perfection. This can apply neither to pleasure nor to reason. A pleasant life without mental function would be similar to that of a lower animal, which is neither aware of the past nor the future and does not even appreciate its present well-being, and a rational life without the capacity for sensation does not seem desirable. Both factors are thus required, and neither can be equated with the absolute Good. It remains to be clarified which of them is more valuable. Protarchus fears that pleasure will fare poorly, but does not want to abandon the effort for truth. (Note: Plato, Philebus 20b–23b)

Before the new investigation can begin, the general question of the classification of the whole of being must be clarified. The whole of reality can be divided into four categories:

1. the Unlimited (ápeiron) or boundlessness,
2. the Limit (péras) or the limit-like
3. the mixture of these two
4. the cause of the mixture.

Everything capable of being increased or decreased, such as "warm" and "cold", "big" and "small", "fast" and "slow", falls into the category of the Unlimited, while equality and all mathematically expressible data belong to the limit-like as definite sizes. The mixture of these two categories comes about because certain limits are set to the naturally unlimited, thus creating structures dependent on numbers. For instance, music arises from a certain mixture of high and low, fast and slow, which is based on numerical ratios. Health, too, is a certain mixture of factors that alone would cause excess and illness. Such mixtures are not arbitrary and random, but are orderly and moderate. Their cause – the fourth category – is what curbs the potentially unlimited with measure and order, ensures the right mixture ratios, and thus produces all that is beautiful and valuable. (Note: Plato, Philebus 23c–27c.)

Pleasure and displeasure are now classified into this categorization. By "pleasure," all pleasant feelings are meant, and by "displeasure," all unpleasant ones. Both belong to the potentially increasable and thus Unlimited. The mixed human life is to be assigned to the third category, to the things created by limiting the Unlimited. Reason has the task of ensuring the right mixture ratio. Thus, it belongs to the fourth category, to the causes of the mixture, which provide structure to the unordered and measureless. This applies not only to reason in humans but also analogously to the reason that governs the entire cosmos and orders it. The cosmic reason ensures, for example, the regular movements of celestial bodies and the change of seasons. Only animated beings can be rational; as reason in humans presupposes a soul, so must the rationally and beautifully ordered cosmos have a soul, the World Soul. (Note: Plato, Philebus 27c–31b)

=== Closer examination of pleasure and pain (31b-55c) ===
==== Two main types of pleasure and pain (31b-35d) ====
With the next step of the investigation, Socrates returns to the question of the types of pleasure and pain. He begins by considering the origin of both states of the human psyche. He sees their cause not in the category to which pleasure and pain belong, but that of the psyche, for the psyche is the locus of both states, insofar as they occur concretely in humans. The psyche belongs to the category of things characterized by mixing, created by the limitation of the unlimited. In living beings, nature has created a harmonious order through rational mixing and limiting of potentially unlimited factors. This is evident, among other things, in health. Such a harmonious state is neither characterized by pleasure nor by pain. Both arise only when the harmony is disturbed and dissolves. Each such disturbance is felt as pain; its remediation is accompanied by a return to natural harmony, which is experienced as pleasure. For example, hunger and thirst are forms of pain resulting from deficiencies – disturbances of a natural balance; their elimination by addressing the deficiency is associated with pleasure. Similarly, an unnatural excess of heat or cold causes pain, while returning to harmony through cooling or warming creates a pleasant feeling. (Note: Plato, Philebus 31b–32b)

The phenomena mentioned represent a first type of pleasure and pain, which is triggered by current physical conditions. A second type arises in the soul through the mere anticipation of pleasurable and painful experiences; its cause is the memory of corresponding experiences. It is also important to note that there is a third state besides the pleasurable and painful one. This is the harmonious and undisturbed state, where pleasure and pain do not occur excessively. Avoiding strong fluctuations between pleasure and pain is characteristic of a life shaped by reason. (Note: Plato,Philebus 32b–33c)

Next, Socrates turns to the type of pleasure and pain that is not a reaction to current physical processes. It is triggered by imaginations that arise from memory. Here, he discusses a pleasure that is produced by the soul alone, without the body. The soul searches in the world of its memories and imaginations for pleasure. Such striving manifests as desire for something. Desire is always a striving for the opposite of the current state; emptiness calls for the need for fullness. One must already know the opposite in order to desire it. Only the soul is capable of this, for only it has memories. The body is limited to the present and can therefore desire nothing. Thus, all desires are purely of the soul. (Note: Plato, Philebus 33c–35d)

==== Truth and falsehood in pleasure and pain (35d-42c) ====
Next, the mixture of pleasure and pain is examined more closely. The question arises as to what these sensations have to do with reality and illusion.

Through the interplay of sensations triggered by the body with purely mental feelings, different mixtures of pleasure and pain arise. When someone suffers from a physical deficiency – an "emptiness" – his pain is either alleviated or intensified by his concurrent imaginations, depending on whether he expects the regaining of the desired fullness or associates the memory of fullness with hopelessness. Imaginations and expectations that generate feelings can be realistic or erroneous. Thus, they each have a specific relation to truth and falsehood. Likewise, according to Socrates' thesis, the sensations of pleasure and pain they evoke are related to truth and falsehood. This means that there are "true" and "false" pleasures. A pleasure experienced in a dream or in madness is of a different quality than one that has a relation to reality. One must distinguish between justified and illusory pleasure and pain; a pleasure based on an illusionary basis is false, lacking a relation to truth. Protarchus sees it differently. For him, pleasure always has the same nature, whether its cause is real or merely imagined. An opinion can be false, but pleasure is always "true" by its mere existence. (Note: Plato, Philebus 35d–37c)

However, Protarchus admits that both opinions and pleasures can have the quality of badness. This leads to the counter-argument of Socrates, who claims similar things for falsehood: Like an opinion, a joy or pain can be misplaced. The qualities "false" and "true" depend on the truth content. Socrates wants to transfer this determination to the associated sensations: It is possible to feel pleasure or pain about something only because one is mistaken about it. Then one not only has a false opinion about it, but the pleasure or pain is also based on a false premise, is misplaced, and thus "false". Protarchus rejects this. He insists that only the opinion is false. To call pleasure "false" as well he finds absurd. (Note: Plato, Philebus 37c–38a)

Opinions arise, as Socrates now explains, from the comparison of perceptions with memories of earlier perceptions. This comparison can go wrong; perceptions and the memories of them can be erroneous. Socrates compares the soul, in which the memories are recorded, to a book that contains true and false reports recorded by a writer and illustrated by a painter. The recordings in the memory along with the images trigger hopes and fears, pleasant and unpleasant feelings in the soul that views them. Since some of the recordings are false and much of what is hoped for or feared will not occur, the pleasure and pain generated by such memories and expectations are also illusory. Like an inaccurate opinion, it has no correlate in reality and is thus false. Bad people have false recordings, they live in illusions, and their pleasures are "false," for they are merely ridiculous imitations of true pleasures. The badness of bad pleasures is based on their falsehood. Protarchus agrees with part of these considerations but disagrees with the last thesis: He does not see that badness must necessarily be due to falsehood. From his perspective, pleasure and pain can indeed be bad, insofar as they are associated with bad things, but this badness is not like that of opinions a consequence of their falsehood, it does not consist in a certain relation to truth and falsehood. (Note: Plato, Philebus 38a–41a)

Following this, Socrates introduces a new argument. He points out that the judgment about the intensity of pleasures and pains depends on the perspective from which one views them when assessing them comparatively. This dependence on perspective he compares to optical illusions, to show that there can be falsehoods in pleasures just as there can be in sensory perceptions. (Note: Plato, Philebus 41a–42c) (Note: See also Mooradian 1995, pp. 91–112; Benardete 1993, pp. 186–189)

==== Pleasurable, painful, and moderate living (42c-53c) ====
Socrates now takes a new approach, starting from the observation that only relatively strong bodily changes are perceived and provoke pleasure and pain. He argues that there is not only a life shaped by pleasure and a life shaped by suffering, but also a third, neutral way of living where pleasure and pain hardly appear because the fluctuations in body condition are weak. With this statement, Socrates counters the doctrine of certain influential philosophers, (Note: Regarding who is meant here, see Schofield 1971; Bringmann 1972, pp. 523–530; Frede 1993, pp. 268–271; Ackeren 2003, p. 267 note 304) who only distinguish between pleasure and pain and claim that pleasure consists of nothing other than the absence of pain or freedom from pain, thus in the neutral state. By defining pleasure merely as the absence of pain, they deny it any independent reality. Thus, they prove to be the sharpest opponents of hedonism. (Note: Plato, Philebus 42c–44c)

An argument by the pleasure-hostile philosophers could be: The strongest forms of pleasure and pain generate the greatest desires. Sick people experience more severe deficiencies than healthy ones. Therefore, they have more intense desires and feel stronger pleasure when these are satisfied. Their pleasure exceeds that of the healthy not in quantity but in intensity. Similarly, it is with the extravagant, who tend to excess: Their pleasure is more intense than that of the prudent and moderate, who do not overdo anything. This means: A poor state of body and soul enables the greatest pleasure. Thus, pleasure has its origin not in excellence (aretḗ), but in its opposite. (Note: Plato, Philebus 44c–45e)

For the purpose of testing the argument, Socrates first considers the three types of pleasure: those caused solely by physical conditions, those purely mental, and those caused by both factors. It turns out that in all three types, the most intense pleasures are by no means particularly pure – that is, free from aspects of displeasure. Rather, all of them are characterized by a significant admixture of displeasure. In the case of purely mental pleasures, this can be well observed in the theater, for example, in a tragedy, where the audience sheds tears and rejoices at the same time. In comedy, too, the mixture becomes apparent: The audience laughs, thus feeling pleasure, but the enjoyment is based on envy, a negative emotion, which is a form of displeasure. It is joy about an evil. One rejoices because the theater characters are ridiculous and fall victim to their ignorance and inability. Thus, pleasure and displeasure are mixed. This happens not only when watching events in the theater but also in the tragedy and comedy of life. The same applies to feelings such as anger, longing, grief, fear, and jealousy. All of these are not pure but mixed with pleasure and displeasure. (Note: Plato, Philebus 45e–50d)

Socrates has shown that many of the pleasures desired by humans – especially the most intense ones – cannot be explained as states of pure pleasure, but are based on a specific mixture of pleasure and displeasure. From this perspective, the designation "false pleasure" is justified. True or genuine are therefore only pure pleasures, i.e., pleasures that neither arise from the elimination of a displeasure nor themselves have an admixture of displeasure. The pure pleasures consist, as Socrates now explains, not in the absence of displeasure, but have their own reality and nature. They relate, for example, to beautiful colors and shapes as well as to pleasant smells and sounds. This also includes the joy of learning, of gaining knowledge. Such joys are moderate in contrast to the violent pleasures. Socrates emphasizes that it only depends on the purity of the pleasure, not on its quantity or intensity; the slightest pure pleasure is more pleasant, more beautiful, and truer than the greatest impure pleasure. (Note: Plato, Philebus 50e–53c)

==== Transience of pleasure (53c-55c) ====
Socrates now raises another topic: the relationship of pleasure to Being and Becoming. This refers to the philosophical distinction between the eternal, perfect, and self-sufficient Being on the one hand, and the transient, imperfect, and dependent Becoming on the other. Being is cause, Becoming is caused. All pleasure arises and passes away. Since it belongs to the realm of the caused and transient, it has no true being, but only becoming. From this, its inferiority is evident, for all that becomes and is subject to decay is by nature defective and always in need of something else. Here Socrates returns to the initial question of the dialogue. His argument is: Everything that becomes is oriented towards a superior Being. Becoming is not an end in itself, but every process of becoming takes place for the sake of a Being. Thus, the Good as the highest value cannot be something that arises for the sake of something else, but only that for which Becoming arises. In this, Socrates believes he has shown that equating pleasure with the Good is ridiculous. He adds further arguments. Protarchus recognizes the cogency of the proof. (Note: Plato, Philebus 53c–55c)

=== Investigation of reason (55c-59c) ===
Following the examination of the value of pleasure, Socrates subjects reason and knowledge to a similar scrutiny. Again, the question of "purity" and "truth" arises, here relating to the accuracy and reliability of the results provided by various fields of knowledge – crafts and sciences. When considering the utility of these fields from this perspective, the superiority of those disciplines involving calculation and measurement over the less precise ones, which rely on observation and estimation, becomes evident. At the same time, it becomes clear that pure theory, which deals with absolute facts, is fundamentally superior to Empirical science, which only deals with approximations. In this sense, pure geometry is above architecture as applied geometry. (Note: Plato, Philebus 55c–57e)

Of importance for the systematics of science is the quality of the approach. In this respect, Dialectics - the expert, systematic analysis following the rules of logic - is superior to all other sciences. It deserves precedence because it provides the clearest and most accurate results with the highest degree of truth. Its object is the realm of the unchangeable being, to which absolute purity and truth belong. The more transient something is, the farther it is from the truth. There can be no reliable knowledge about changeable things. (Note: Plato, Philebus 57e–59c)

=== Hierarchy of goods (59d-67b) ===
From the considerations so far, the hierarchy of goods emerges. Reason is closer to the True, the Real, the absolutely Good than pleasure, hence it stands above it in the hierarchy. However, reason is not identical with the Good, for otherwise it would suffice for man alone and pleasure would be unnecessary. (Note: Plato, Philebus 59d–61a)

In determining what is good in terms of human life, Socrates draws on the already gained knowledge that life is mixed with pleasure and displeasure, and therefore it depends on the right mix. Human life is a mixture of different factors. Now the question arises as to which types of knowledge should be included in the mix. It turns out that not only the highest and most reliable knowledge, pure theory, is needed for a successful life, but also some empirical and technical knowledge despite its inaccuracy. No subordinate knowledge can ever be harmful if the superior one is present, thus all types of knowledge are welcome. The case is different with pleasure. The greatest and most intense pleasures are very harmful, as they destroy knowledge. Therefore, only the "true" pleasures, which are pure and in harmony with temperance, are permissible. (Note: Plato, Philebus 61a–64a)

Now it is to be investigated what constitutes the good, valuable mix that enables a successful life. The question arises whether this crucial factor is more related to pleasure or to reason. Socrates finds the answer simple, even trivial, because everyone knows it: The quality of a mix always depends on the right measure and proportionality. Where these are lacking, there is always ruinous chaos. The right measure manifests itself in the form of beauty and excellence. Moreover, truth must always be mixed in. In human life, the Good does not appear immediately in its unity, but it can be grasped as beauty, appropriateness, and truth. The efficacy of the Good has "found refuge in the nature of the Beautiful". (Note: Plato, Philebus 64a–65a)

From these considerations, the exact determination of the hierarchical order of goods finally emerges. Reason is far superior to pleasure, as it has a greater share in truth as well as in measure and beauty. The highest of the goods below the absolutely Good is the right measure, followed by beauty, and thirdly reason. Fourth place is occupied by the sciences, arts, and true opinions, and fifth by the pure pleasures. This finding remains unchanged even if all oxen, horses, and other animals collectively advocate for the precedence of pleasure by pursuing it. Protarchus agrees to this also in the name of Philebus. Philebus no longer speaks. (Note: Plato Philebus 65a–67b)

== Philosophy ==
The starting point of the discussion is the question whether pleasure or reason should take precedence. Plato does not limit himself to clarifying this question but uses the topic to outline a philosophical theory of the entire reality of being and becoming.

Mark Moes highlights a therapeutic goal of the dialogue. According to his interpretation, the primary concern is that Socrates acts as a therapist, a "soul doctor," who, like a physician, first makes a diagnosis and then turns to therapy. Accordingly, it is about the health of the soul, which Socrates sees as harmed by hedonism. His efforts aim to lead Protarchus to the right way of life. This effect is also intended for readers inclined towards hedonism.

=== True and false pleasure ===
One topic that has attracted attention in modern research is the interpretation of Socrates' argumentation for the "falseness" of pleasures, including what exactly the term "false" means in this context and to which aspect of certain pleasures it refers. It is debated whether for Plato's Socrates a false pleasure, due to its illusory character, is not a real pleasure but only appears to be among pleasures, or whether it is a falsehood analogous to the error of an opinion. In the latter case, the falsehood is a defect that does not prevent an actual pleasure from existing.

Furthermore, it is debated whether Plato provides a comprehensive interpretation of pleasure that encompasses all types of pleasure, or whether the types are so fundamentally different for him that he refrains from a universally valid determination of the nature of pleasure. The former interpretation is the traditional and predominant one.

=== Relation to the theory of forms ===
Difficulties arise in the connection of the four classes of beings introduced by Plato's Socrates with the Platonic theory of forms. It is disputed whether the classes – or at least some of them – are to be understood as forms. In particular, the assumption that even the Unlimited is a form is problematic and controversial. Moreover, it has been discussed whether the forms fit into one of the four categories or are identifiable with one of them.

Moreover, it is unclear what role the theory of forms plays in the Philebus. Since it is not explicitly addressed, it has been suggested that it is not present here. This assumption fits the hypothesis that Plato distanced himself from the theory of forms in his last creative period, having abandoned it or at least considered it in need of revision. However, Plato's Socrates in the Philebus places great emphasis on the distinction between the superior realm of unchanging being and the world of becoming and passing away dependent on it. Thus, Plato at least held onto a core component of the concept underlying the theory of forms. The question of whether he has changed his fundamental position is highly disputed in research. The view of the "Unitarians," who believe he consistently maintained a coherent perspective, is opposed to the "development hypothesis" of the "Revisionists," who assume a deviation from the theory of forms or at least from its "classical" variant. From a Unitarian perspective, the worldview presented in the Philebus is interpreted as a response to the problematization of the theory of forms in the dialogue Parmenides. Donald Davidson took a “revisionist” stance on the Philebus: Plato, when he wrote this dialogue, no longer believed that the theory of forms could be the main foundation of an ethical concept. He had abandoned the idea of a close link between forms and values. Therefore, he had to find a new approach for his ethics. (Note: For the implicit presence of the theory of forms in the Philebus, argue, among others, Moravcsik 1979, pp. 81–104; Fahrnkopf 1977, pp. 202–207; Benitez 1989, pp. 3–6, 21–31, 39–42, 87–91, 129–132; Reale 1997, pp. 358–361, 450–454; Migliori 1993, pp. 75–84, 433 f., 450–457; Hampton 1990, pp. 7–11, 14–21; Parente 1996, pp. 205–219. The opposing position is confessed, among others, by Shiner 1974, pp. 11, 30, 34–37 (cautiously; cf. Shiner 1979, pp. 71–77; Dancy 1984, pp. 160–193; Sayre 2005, pp. 174–185; Teloh 1981, pp. 176–188.)

=== Relation to the Unwritten doctrines ===
Another controversial topic is the relationship of the metaphysics of the Philebus to Plato's unwritten doctrines, a hypothesized set of doctrines which he allegedly never fixed in writing, which many scholars of the "Tübingen School" of Plato scholarship believe can be reconstructed in outline from individual hints in the dialogues and statements in other sources. Proponents of this hypothesis believe they have also found indications of the unwritten doctrines in the Philebus, or interpret statements in the dialogue in light of the unwritten doctrines.

According to one such interpretation, the expressions used in the Philebus, “limit” and “the Unlimited,” correspond to the terms “the One” (to hen, unity) and “unlimited” or “indeterminate duality” (ahóristos dyás) of the unwritten doctrines. The “More and Less” in the Philebus, the capability for increase and decrease, is accordingly “the Great and Small” or “the Great-Small” (to méga kai to mikrón) of the unwritten doctrines; with this concept, Plato is said to have described the indeterminate dyad. (Note: Erler 2006, p. 259 (cautiously agreeing); Sayre 2005, pp. 136–155 (agreeing; critically to Hampton 1990, pp. 98–101); Frede 1993, pp. 403–417 (skeptical); Benitez 1989, p. 59 (rejecting); Mouroutsou 2007, p. 282 (rejecting).)

=== Equal measure ===
A main idea developed in the Philebus is the extraordinary importance of measure. For Plato's Socrates, proportion, or equal measure plays a central role both in the order of the world and in human life as the basis of all that is good and beautiful. This is contrasted with the immoderation of hedonistic excess. This emphasis on the mathematical order of the world and its philosophical exploration, as well as the opposition between limitation and boundlessness, reveals the influence of Pythagoreanism on Plato.

=== Chorismos ===
Expressions like "becoming to being" (génesis eis ousían) (Note: Plato, Philebus 26d) indicate Plato's engagement with the question of how to explain the connection between the two fundamentally different realms of being and becoming. This problem, known in modern research as Chorismos, occupied him intensely.

== Reception ==
=== Antiquity and the Middle Ages ===
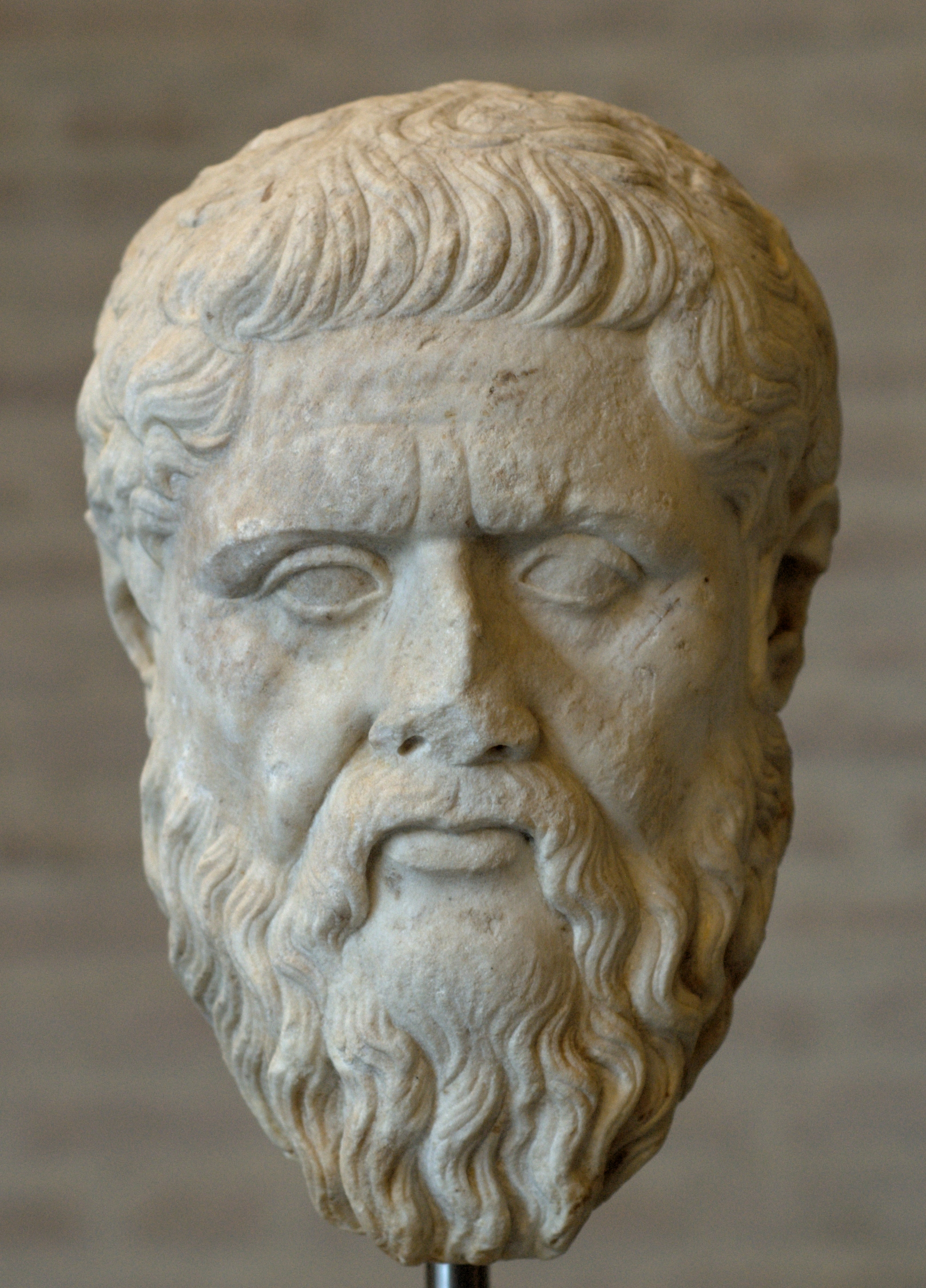
Plato (Roman copy of the Greek portrait of Plato by Silanion, Glyptothek Munich)

Although Plato's student Aristotle never names Philebus explicitly, he engaged deeply with the Platonic theory of pleasure, and often refers to it in content. Aristotle might also have had the Philebus in mind when discussing the unwritten teachings. Aristotle's student Theophrastus of Eresus opposed the thesis of Plato's Socrates that there is a false pleasure, and adhered to the view of Protarchus that all pleasure is “true”.

The rhetorician and literary critic Dionysius of Halicarnassus praised Philebus; he noted approvingly that Plato had preserved the Socratic style in this work. In the tetralogical order of Plato's works, which was apparently introduced in the 1st century BC in a now-lost work of the scholar Thrasyllus, Philebus belongs to the third tetralogy. The historian of philosophy Diogenes Laertius classified it among the “ethical” writings and gave the alternative title “On Pleasure”. Plutarch attempted to link the four classes of being, which Plato's Socrates discusses in Philebus, with the five "greatest kinds" (Note: Plato, Sophist 254b–255e) named in the dialogue Sophist by adding a fifth class and interpreting the classes as reflections of the kinds. The famous physician Galen wrote a now-lost treatise “On the Transitions in the Philebus”, in which he examined the reasoning processes in the dialogue. In the 3rd century, a Middle Platonist living in Athens named Eubulus wrote a now-lost treatise that included a discussion on Philebus. Another Middle Platonist, Democritus, who also lived in the 3rd century, engaged with the dialogue; whether he wrote a commentary is unclear.

In Late Antiquity, the Neoplatonists showed a great interest in Philebus. They focused particularly on the metaphysical aspects of the dialogue, though the ethical aspects were also considered.

Plotinus († 270), the founder of Neoplatonism, frequently referred to Philebus in his treatise titled How the Multiplicity of Ideas Came About, and Concerning the Good. Plotinus' most famous student Porphyry († 301/305) wrote a Philebus commentary, of which only fragments survive. His fellow student Amelius may also have written a commentary.

Porphyry's student Iamblichus († around 320/325), a leading representative of late antique Neoplatonism, instructed his school to study Philebus as one of the twelve dialogues he considered most important. He wrote a commentary on it, of which only a few fragments are preserved.

Also, the Neoplatonists Proclus and Marinus of Neapolis, teaching in Athens in the 5th century, commented on the dialogue. Marinus, a student of Proclus, burned his extensive commentary after the philosopher Isidore, whom he had asked for an opinion, criticized the work and expressed the opinion that Proclus' commentary was sufficient. It is possible that Theodorus of Asine and Syrianus also wrote commentaries. No single work from this literature has survived. Only the transcript of a lecture by Damascius († after 538) on the Philebus is preserved. It was previously mistakenly attributed to Olympiodorus the Younger. Damascius critically addressed Proclus' interpretation of Philebus.

In the Middle Ages, the dialogue was known to some Byzantine scholars, but the Latin-speaking educated of the West had no access to the work.

=== Early Modern period ===
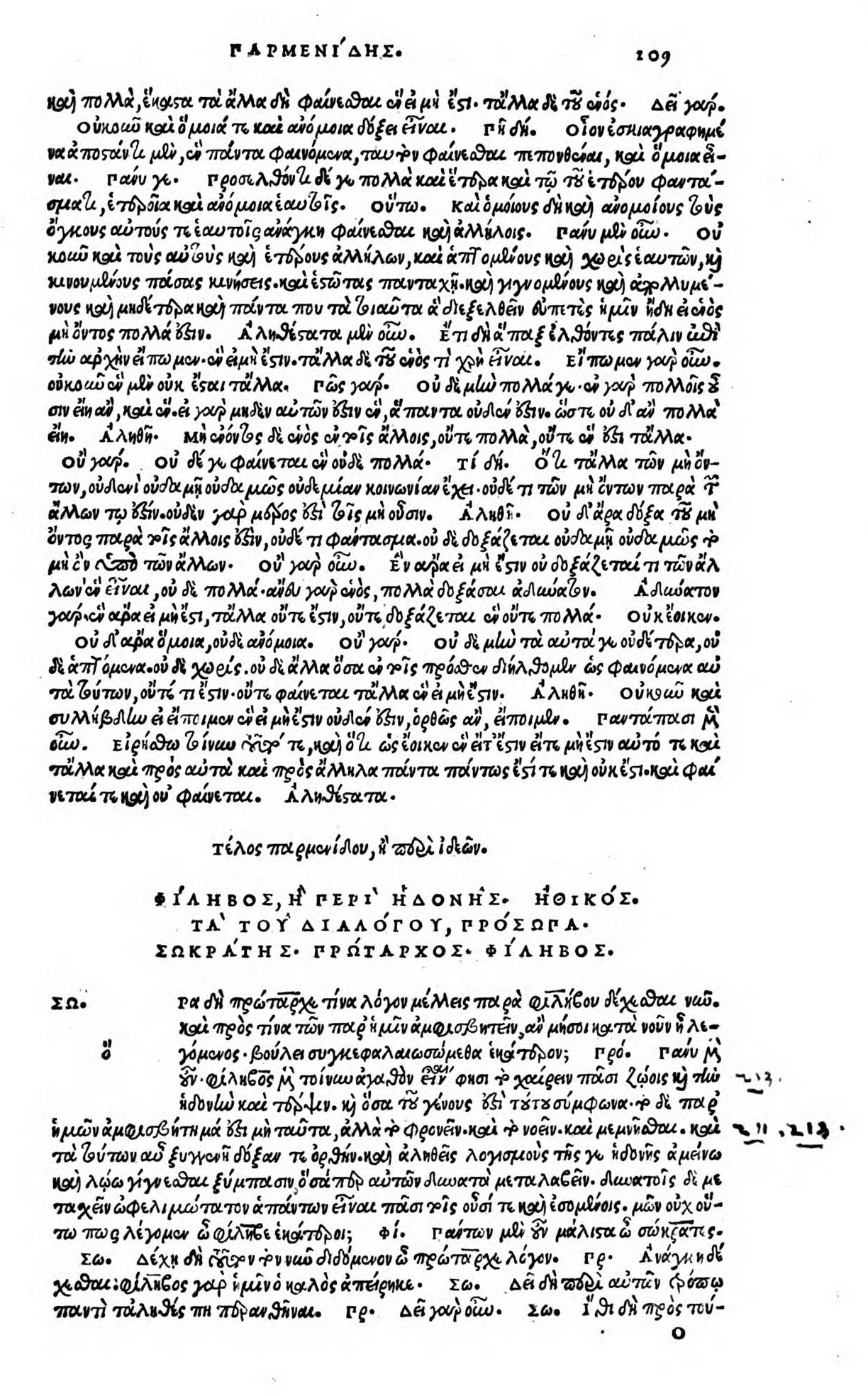
The beginning of Philebus in the first edition, Venice 1513

Philebus was rediscovered in the West during the era of Renaissance humanism. The humanist and Plato scholar Marsilio Ficino published a Latin translation in 1484 in Florence as part of the complete edition of his Plato translations, while the first edition of the Greek text, edited by Markos Musuros, was published in September 1513 in Venice by Aldo Manuzio, as part of the first Greek edition of Plato's works. Ficino held the Philebus in especially high esteem; when his patron, the statesman Cosimo de’ Medici, lay on his deathbed in July 1464, Ficino had read an early version of the Latin text to him. Already in early 1464, Cosimo had expressed his special interest in Philebus, “Plato’s book on the highest good,” as he sought nothing more eagerly than the knowledge of the surest way to happiness. Additionally, Ficino wrote a commentary on the dialogue, the third and final version of which was printed in 1496, and he delivered lectures to a large audience on the issues discussed in Philebus. His goal was to promote Platonism and push back against the influence of contemporary Aristotelians. (Note: See Berti 1996b and the introduction to Ficino's commentary by the editor Allen 1975, pp. 1–22)

=== Modern period ===
Friedrich Wilhelm Joseph Schelling drew on Philebus in his 1794 essay Timaeus, where he dealt with the question of the emergence of a perceivable world. Schelling was particularly interested in the four kinds, which he called “general world concepts,” and the “becoming to being.” He emphasized that the four kinds should not be understood as concepts of being, they are not designations for something existent, but categories for all real existents. The Unlimited should be interpreted as the principle of reality of all that is real, also as the principle of quality, while limitation as the principle of quantity and form of all that is real. In his dialogue Bruno (1802), Schelling referred to Philebus when determining the subject of philosophy.

Hegel found in Philebus “the Esoteric of Platonic Philosophy”; this meant the speculative, which, although published, remains hidden “to those who do not have the interest to grasp it.” Pleasure apparently belonged to the realm of the concrete, but one must understand that pure thoughts are the substantial, deciding over all else that is concrete. The nature of pleasure arises from the nature of the infinite, the indeterminate, to which it belongs.

The philosopher Herbert Marcuse engaged with Philebus in his 1938 published paper On the Critique of Hedonism. Marcuse observed that, introduction of truth and falsehood as categories applicable to each individual pleasure, Plato subordinated happiness to the criterion of truth. A pleasure becomes untrue when the object it refers to is “in itself” not pleasurable, a question which concerns not only the object of pleasure but also its subject. For Marcuse, Plato thus connects the goodness of man with the truth of pleasure, making pleasure a moral issue. This places pleasure under the claim of society and brings it into the realm of duty. Plato, however, separates pleasure “from all essential personal relations” by only considering “pure” pleasure to consist of inanimate objects as objects, the things farthest removed from the societal life process.

Hans-Georg Gadamer examined Philebus from a phenomenological perspective. He also later intensely engaged with the dialogue, which he interpreted hermeneutically. He attempted to show with Philebus that the idea of the good, according to Plato's view, is immanent in human life and an aspect of lived experience. In doing so, he brought Plato's way of thinking closer to that of Aristotle; he believed that Aristotelian thought was anticipated in Philebus. With this approach of the habilitation thesis, he was under the influence of his teacher Martin Heidegger, from whose viewpoint he later partially distanced himself. In a Heidegger-oriented understanding, Gadamer found Plato's thoughts on “true” or “false” pleasure comprehensible. The pleasure thus conceived is “true, insofar as it is supposed in it that being is pleasurable, which is pleasurable.” The disposition of pleasure is always “understood from its having discovered the being, ‘in which’ it is had.” Plato sees it “as a way of encountering the world.” This concept of pleasure corresponded to Gadamer's own view; he assumed with Heidegger that affects are a distinct way of discovering being, independent of their connection with opinions. Moreover, Gadamer equated the good with the beautiful, thus “aestheticizing” Platonic ethics. The engagement with Philebus, particularly with the dialectic understanding presented therein, played a significant role in the development of Gadamer's philosophy. (Note: To Gadamer’s Philebus reception generally see Gill & Renaud 2010, pp. 9–20.)

Jacques Derrida chose the passage in Philebus where the soul is compared to a book containing the recordings of a scribe and the images of a painter (Note: Plato, Philebus 38e–39e) as his starting point when he engaged with writing and Mimesis in his essay La double séance (“The Double Session”), part of his 1972 published work La dissémination.
