= Severianus of Damascus =

Severianus of Damascus (Greek: Σεβηριανός) was a Roman pagan politician who served under the emperor Marcian (450–457).

Severianus' life is known mainly from the writings of Damascius, including what was incorporated into the Suda and the Epitome of Photius. He was born into a prominent family of Damascus descended from Roman colonists who had once settled in Alexandria. His father was Auxentius and his grandfather Callinicus. His father wanted him to become a lawyer and to this end he specialised in Roman law while also studying poetry and rhetoric. His father refused his request to study philosophy under Proclus at the Athenian Academy, but after his father's death he went.

Too ambitious for the professional philosophical life, Severianus entered politics. He rose to high office—Damascius calls him an archon—but he feuded with his superiors and was draconian in meting out justice. He blamed the short duration of his success in politics to a few unjustifiable death sentences. The office he held, unspecified by Damascius, was probably that of a provincial governor. He feuded with Aspar and Ardabur and these were probably the superiors mentioned elsewhere. Ardabur was magister militum for the East from 453 to 466. This suggests that his tenure fell within this period and lay in the East.

After the abrupt end of his political career, Severianus returned to Athens. There Damascius met him in 469. He was offered a high post—probably the praetorian prefecture of the East—by the emperor Zeno (474–491) on the condition that he become a Christian, but he refused. He had already gotten the worst of his dispute with the Christians Aspar and Ardabur because of his devout paganism. He showed the letter he received from Zeno to Damascius. He joined a plot to assassinate Zeno and restore paganism, but was betrayed by his co-conspirators, among whom was Aspar's youngest son, Herminericus. These events probably took place before 478, since Damascius left Athens for Alexandria that year and would have lost personal contact with Severianus.

Severianus wrote numerous letters. He encouraged Damascius' brother Julian to study literature. He delivered commentaries on the speeches of Isocrates, praised by Damascius as true philosophy rather than sophistry. He disdained the writings of Callimachus. According to Damascius, contemporaries respected his judgement of literary merit although he was obstinate and vain.

== Bibliography ==
- Brown, Peter (1992). Power and Persuasion in Late Antiquity: Towards a Christian Empire. University of Wisconsin Press.
- Martindale, John R., ed. (1980). The Prosopography of the Later Roman Empire: Volume II, AD 395–527. Cambridge: Cambridge University Press. ISBN 0-521-20159-4.
- Nicholson, Oliver P. (2018). "Severianus". In Oliver Nicholson (ed.). The Oxford Dictionary of Late Antiquity. Vol. 2. Oxford University Press. p. 1365.
- Watts, Edward J. (2010). Riot in Alexandria: Tradition and Group Dynamics in Late Antique Pagan and Christian Communities. University of California Press.
