= Azone =

Term in mythology

Azone /ˈeɪzoʊn/ (Greek: Ἄζωνοι) is a term in mythology anciently applied to gods and goddesses that were not the private divinities of any particular country or people. Azones were acknowledged as deities in every country, and worshipped in every nation. The word is etymologically derived from Greek for "without" and "country". The azones were to a degree above the visible and sensible deities, which were called zonei (Greek: Ζωναῖοι), who inhabited some particular part of the world, and never stirred out of the district or zone that was assigned them.

The Greek philosopher Damascius discusses the azones in his commentary on Plato's Parmenides.
