= Ilsetraut Hadot =

German-born French philosopher and historian (1928–2026)

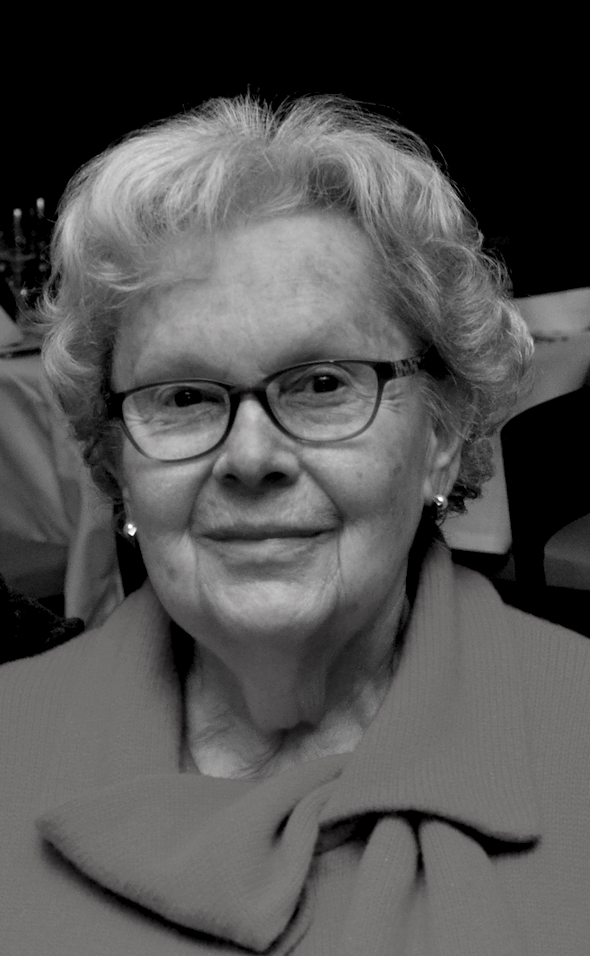
- Born: Ilsetraut Ludolff; 20 December 1928; Berlin, Brandenburg, Prussia, Germany
- Died: 13 April 2026 (aged 97); Limours, France
- Education: Free University of Berlin; Sorbonne University
- Spouse: Pierre Hadot
- Awards: Prix François-Millepierres (2015)
- Scientific career
- Fields: History of philosophy

Ilsetraut Hadot (French: [ado]; née Ludolff; 20 December 1928 – 13 April 2026) was a German-born French historian of philosophy who specialised in Stoicism, Neoplatonism, and more generally in ancient philosophy.

== Life and career ==
Ilsetraut Hadot was born in Berlin, Germany, on 20 December 1928.

In 1978, Hadot won the Victor Cousin prize of the Académie française for her work The problem of Alexandrian Neoplatonism. Hierocles and Simplicius. In 2015, she received the François-Millepierres prize by the Académie for her work Seneca. Spiritual Direction and Practice of Philosophy.

In 1966, she graduated the Dr. Phil. at the Free University of Berlin about Seneca and Spiritual Direction in Antiquity. She defended her State thesis in 1977, a Doctor of Arts at Paris-Sorbonne University (Paris IV).

She met Pierre Hadot during a symposium in Cologne in 1962 and they married in Berlin in 1966. He was also a specialist in ancient philosophy. Together, they wrote Learn to Philosophize in Antiquity, in 2004.

Hadot died on 13 April 2026, at the age of 97.

== Research ==
Hadot was a classical philologist and a specialist in ancient philosophy. She wrote about Seneca, the history of education in antiquity and Neoplatonism. Hadot edited, commentated and translated the commentary of Simplicius (a Neoplatonic philosopher) on the Enchiridion of Epictetus.

== Works ==
- Seneca und die Griechisch-Römische Tradition der Seelenleitung, Berlin, Walter de Gruyter & Co., 1969, 232p.
- (With Pierre Hadot) Apprendre à philosopher dans l'Antiquité : L'enseignement du « Manuel d'Épictète » et son commentaire néoplatonicien, ("Learn to Philosophize in Antiquity: the Lesson from Enchiridion of Epictetus and its Neoplatonician Commentary") Paris, Le Livre de Poche, 2004, 216 p. ISBN 9782253109358.
- Arts libéraux et philosophie dans la pensée antique : Contribution à l'histoire de l'éducation et de la culture dans l'Antiquité ("Liberal Arts and Philosophy in Ancient thought: Contribution at the history of education and culture in Antiquity"), Paris, Vrin, 2006, 576 p. ISBN 9782711618231.
- Le Néoplatonicien Simplicius à la lumière des recherches contemporaines : Un bilan critique (The Neoplatonician Simplicius in light of contemporary researches: a critical appraisal) (with two contributions of Philippe Vallat), Saint Augustin, Academia Verlag, 2014, 309 p. ISBN 9783896656391.
- Le Problème du néoplatonisme alexandrin : Hiéroclès et Simplicius (The Problem of alexandrian neoplatonism : Hierocles and Simplicius), Paris, Études augustiniennes, 1978, 243 p. ISBN 9782851210234.
- Sénèque. Direction spirituelle et pratique de la philosophie (Seneca. Spiritual Direction and practice of philosophy), Paris, Vrin, 2014, 456 p. ISBN 9782711625697
- Studies on the Neoplatonist Hierocles, Philadelphia, American philosophical society, 2004, 152 p. ISBN 0-87169-941-9
- Athenian and Alexandrian Neoplatonism and the Harmonization of Aristotle and Plato, Leiden, Boston, Brill, 2015, 188 p. ISBN 9789004280076

== Translations and prefaces ==
- Seneca, Consolations, Paris, Payot & Rivages, 1992, 140 p. ISBN 9782869305168, translated by Colette Lazam, preface by Ilsetraut Hadot.
- Simplicius, Commentaire sur les Catégories ("Commentary on the Categories"), Leyde, Brill, 1989, Philosophia Antiqua, 240 p. ISBN 9789004090156, translated under the direction of Ilsetraut Hadot.
- Simplicius, Commentaire sur le Manuel d'Épictète. Introduction & édition critique du texte grec par Ilsetraut Hadot ("Commentary on the Enchiridion of Epictetus. Introduction & critical edition of the Greek text by Ilsetraut Hadot"), Leyden, New-York, Cologne, Brill, 1996, 479p.
- Simplicius, Commentaire sur le Manuel d'Épictète. Chapitres I-XXIX ("Commentary on the Enchiridion of Epictetus. Chapters I-XXIX"), Paris, Les Belles Lettres, 2001, 314 p. ISBN 9782251004938
