= Priscian of Lydia =

6th-century Neoplatonic philosopher

Priscian of Lydia (or Priscianus; Ancient Greek: Πρισκιανὸς ὁ Λυδός Prīskiānós ho Lȳdós; Latin: Priscianus Lydus; fl. 6th century) was one of the last of the Neoplatonic philosophers. Two works of his have survived.

== Life ==
A contemporary of Simplicius of Cilicia, Priscian was born in Lydia, probably in the late 5th century. He was one of the last Neoplatonists to study at the Academy when Damascius was at its head. When Justinian I closed the school in 529, Priscian, together with Damascius, Simplicius, and four other colleagues were forced to seek asylum in the court of the Persian king Chosroes. By 533 they were allowed back into the Byzantine Empire after Justinian and Chosroes concluded a peace treaty, in which it was provided that the philosophers would be allowed to return.

== Works ==
Two works of Priscian's have survived:

- An epitome of Theophrastus' On Sense-Perception
- Answers to Chosroes (Solutiones ad Chosroen)

The Answers to Chosroes contain a series of answers to philosophical questions which were apparently posed to Priscian in a debate at the Persian court during his exile. The text exists only in a late, corrupt Latin translation. Priscian mentions: Plato's Timaeus, Phaedo and Phaedrus; Aristotle's Politics, Physics, On the Heavens, Generation and Corruption, On Dreams and On Prophesying by Dreams; Hippocrates, Strabo's Geography, Ptolemy's Almagest, Iamblichus' On the Soul and the works of Plotinus and Proclus. The list is a catalog of Neoplatonic works on cosmology and natural history.

It has also been suggested that the commentary on Aristotle's On the Soul attributed to Simplicius, was written by Priscian, but this is disputed.
