= Marinus of Neapolis =

5th century Neoplatonic philosopher

Marinus (Ancient Greek: Μαρῖνος ὁ Νεαπολίτης; born c. 440 AD) was a Byzantine Neoplatonic philosopher, mathematician and rhetorician born in Flavia Neapolis (modern Nablus), Palaestina Secunda. He was a student of Proclus in Athens. His surviving works are an introduction to Euclid's Data; a Life of Proclus, and two astronomical texts.

Most of what we know of his life comes from an epitome of a work by Damascius conserved in the Byzantine Suda encyclopedia.

== Life ==
He was, according to his pupil Damascius, born a Samaritan. (Note: 'He says that the successor of Proclus, Marinus, came from Neapolis in Palestine, a city situated near the mountain called Argarizon Then the impious writer uttered the blasphemy that on this mountain there is a most holy sanctuary of Zeus the Highest, to whom Abraham the father of the old Hebrew consecrated himself'. Vita Isadori, 141. (Mor 2016, p. 376)) Whether this information is correct is disputed, but it is quite possible. Damascius also adds that he had converted from Samaritanism.

He came to Athens at a time when, with the exception of Proclus, there was a great dearth of eminent men in the Neoplatonist school. He was appointed as successor (diadochos) to Proclus, sometime before the latter's death, during the period of the teacher's infirmity. Proclus dedicated to Marinus his commentary on Plato's Myth of Er.

Proclus himself, it is reported, worried that Marinus himself was of delicate constitution. During this period, the professors of the old Greek religion suffered persecution at the hands of the Christians and Marinus was compelled to seek refuge at Epidaurus, where he died, at a date unknown.

== Works ==
Only a remnant of his output survives. His chief surviving work was a biography of Proclus, since it is the main source of information on Proclus' life. This was written in a combination of prose and epic hexameters, of which only the former survives.

The publication of the biography is fixed by internal evidence to the year of Proclus's death; for he mentions an eclipse which will happen when the first year after that event is completed. It was first published with the works of Marcus Aurelius in 1559; it was republished separately by Fabricius at Hamburg in 1700, and re-edited in 1814 by Boissonade with emendations and notes. He is also the author of a commentary (or introduction) on the Data of Euclid, and a commentary on Theon's Little Commentary. There is also a surviving astronomical text which discusses the Milky Way.

His lost works included commentaries on Aristotle, on Theon of Alexandria and on some of the dialogues of Plato. He is said to have destroyed his commentary on Plato's Philebus on the advice of a pupil he was tutoring, Isidorus. According to a version of the story written by Damascius, when Marinus showed his student, to whom he taught Aristotelianism, this commentary, which he had just completed, Isidorus prevailed on him to destroy it, arguing that since the 'divine' Proclus had himself written a definitive commentary which was the final word on the topic. Current scholarship suspects that this advice arose from fears that Marinus' commentary would, despite his best efforts, betray traces of material that might undermine the reigning Neoplatonic paradigm.
