= Simplicius of Cilicia =

Byzantine philosopher (c. 480 – c. 540)

- Born: c. AD 480; Cilicia, Byzantine Empire
- Died: c. AD 540

Education
- Academic advisors: Ammonius Hermiae; Damascius

Philosophical work
- Era: Medieval philosophy
- Region: Western philosophy
- School: Neoplatonism
- Institutions: Platonic Academy
- Main interests: Presocratic philosophy; Harmonization of Platonism and Aristotelianism

Simplicius of Cilicia (/sɪmˈplɪʃiəs/; Greek: Σιμπλίκιος ὁ Κίλιξ; c. 480 – c. 540) was a Byzantine philosopher, a disciple of Ammonius Hermiae and Damascius, and one of the last of the Neoplatonists. He was among the pagan philosophers persecuted by Justinian in the early 6th century, and was forced for a time to seek refuge in the Persian court, before being allowed back into the Byzantine Empire. He wrote extensively on the works of Aristotle. Although his writings are all commentaries on Aristotle and other authors, rather than original compositions, his intelligent and prodigious learning makes him the last great philosopher of pagan antiquity. His works have preserved much information about earlier philosophers which would have otherwise been lost.

== Life ==
Little is known about Simplicius' life. Based on his education, it is likely he was born some time around 480. His commentary on Aristotle's On the Heavens can be definitively dated to 538, which is the latest known definitive evidence for his life, making it likely he died some time around 540. An older source dates his life to c. 490 – c. 560.

Simplicius was a disciple of Ammonius Hermiae, and Damascius, and was consequently one of the last members of the Neoplatonist school. The school had its headquarters in Athens. It became the centre of the last efforts to maintain Hellenistic religion against the encroachments of Christianity. Imperial edicts enacted in the 5th century against paganism gave legal protection to pagans against personal maltreatment. We know little about where Simplicius lived and taught. That he not only wrote, but taught, is proved by the address to his hearers in the commentary on the Physica Auscultatio of Aristotle, as well as by the title of his commentary on the Categories. He had received his training partly in Alexandria, under Ammonius, partly in Athens, as a disciple of Damascius; and it was probably in one of these two cities that he subsequently took up his abode; for, with the exception of these cities and Constantinople, it would have been difficult to find a town which possessed the collections of books he needed, and he is unlikely to have gone to Constantinople. One claim at least asserts that Simplicius went to Harran, in what is modern-day south-eastern Turkey.

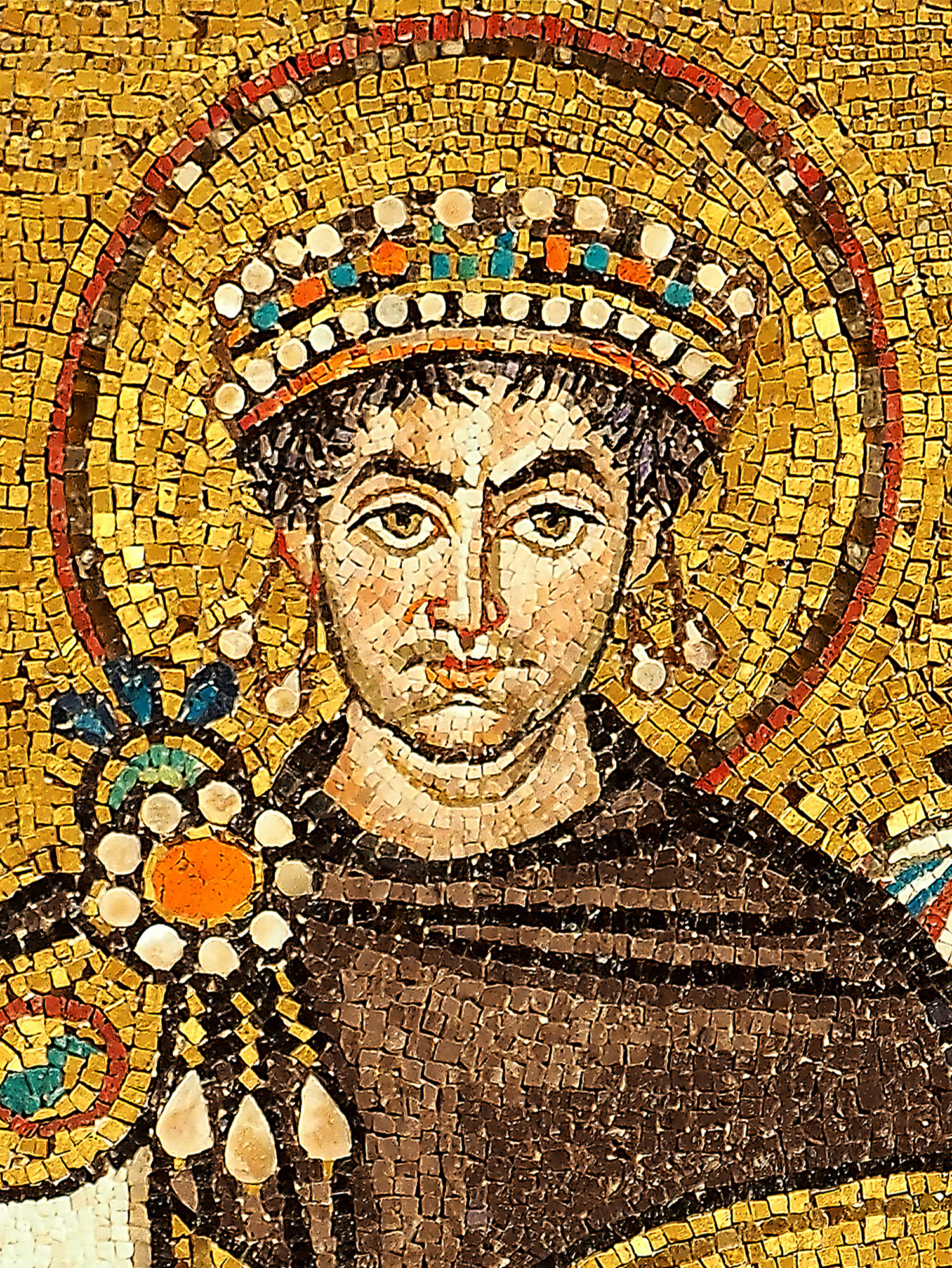
The Emperor Justinian ordered that Pagans be banned from government posts and teaching.

In the year 529 the emperor Justinian ordered that pagans should be removed from government posts and banned from teaching. Some were robbed of their property, some put to death. The order specified that if they did not within three months convert to Christianity, they were to be banished from the Empire. Probably also the property of the Platonist school, which in the time of Proclus was valued at more than 1000 gold pieces, was confiscated; at least, Justinian deprived the physicians and teachers of the liberal arts of the provision-money which had been assigned to them by previous emperors, and confiscated funds which the citizens had provided for spectacles and other civic purposes. Seven philosophers, Simplicius of Cilicia, Eulamius of Phrygia, Priscian of Lydia, Hermes and Diogenes of Phoenicia, Isidore of Gaza, and Damascius, the last president of the Platonist school in Athens, who was their head, hearing stories of how the famous Persian king Khosrow I, who had succeeded to the throne in 531, was a Platonic Philosopher King, decided to go to Persia. But they were disappointed in their hopes, finding adultery and other vices to be common in Persia, and finding that Khosrow’s knowledge was vacuous. After this, they returned to Rome, despite Khosrow’s affection for them. Nonetheless, Khosrow, in a peace treaty concluded with Justinian c. 533 stipulated that the philosophers should be allowed to return, and to practice their rites in peace. Of the subsequent fortunes of the seven philosophers we learn nothing. As to his personal history, especially his migration to Persia, no definite allusions are to be found in the writings of Simplicius. Only at the end of his explanation of the treatise of Epictetus, Simplicius mentions, with gratitude, the consolation which he had found under tyrannical oppression in such ethical contemplations; which might suggest that it was composed during, or immediately after, the above-mentioned persecutions.

== Philosophy ==
One of Simplicius' main concerns was the harmonization of Platonic and Aristotelian philosophy. Simplicius, as a Neoplatonist, endeavoured to show that Aristotle agrees with Plato even on those points which he controverts, so that he may lead the way to their deeper, hidden meaning. This systematic exposition was part of the widespread effort in late antique Neoplatonism to present the most well-known authorities of the classical pagan tradition as representatives of one and the same venerable doctrine, which was intended to present it as a superior alternative to Christianity, and to refute the Christian argument that because the pagan thinkers differ among themselves, they therefore do not possess the truth. Simplicius argued that Aristotle's objections to Plato's teachings did not concern the factual core, but only differed in certain formulations. Simplicius explained his approach on the occasion of his examination of the philosophy of time, arguing that it is not important to know Aristotle's view of this problem; rather, one must first recognize what time actually is. Then, starting from there, one could get closer to Aristotle's insights. In other respects, too, he postulated a fundamental agreement between the core ideas of the important philosophical teachers and directions, insofar as they seemed to be compatible with the Neoplatonic world view. When in doubt, he opted for a harmonizing interpretation. Where this was not possible, he took a clear position, such as with his rejection of the materialism of the Stoics.

In his view not only Plotinus, but also Syrianus, Proclus, and Ammonius, are great philosophers, who have penetrated into the depths of the wisdom of Plato. Many of the more ancient Greek philosophers he also brings into a connection with Platonism. He is, however, distinguished from his predecessors, whom he so admires, in making less frequent application of Orphic, Hermetic, Chaldean, and other Theologumena of the East; partly in proceeding carefully and modestly in the explanation and criticism of particular points, and in striving with diligence to draw from the original sources a thorough knowledge of the older Greek philosophy. Although averse to Christianity he abstains from assailing Christian doctrines, even when he combats expressly the work of his contemporary, John Philoponus, directed against the Aristotelian doctrine of the eternity of the universe. In Ethics he seems to have abandoned the mystical pantheistic purification-theory of the Neoplatonists, and to have found full satisfaction in the ethical system of the later Stoics, however little he was disposed towards their logical and physical doctrines.

=== Astronomy ===
Aristotle had already taken the view that mathematics, as a superordinate science, was allowed to provide axioms to a subordinate science such as astronomy and was responsible for the justification and explanation of astronomical phenomena; the superordinate science knows the causes, the subordinate only the facts. Following this principle, Aristotle used geometric definitions and insights for his cosmological explanations. Philoponus turned against his method of argumentation, believing that a mathematical argument related to physics could be invalidated by pointing to the nature of physical reality, which so limited the mathematical possibility that the argument lost its basis. Thus, mathematical principles are not fully applicable in the physical world. This view met with vehement criticism from Simplicius, who called for an unimpeded transition from physics to its mathematical principles and, conversely, an unrestricted application of mathematical principles to physics, and especially to astronomy. He considered deductive reasoning to be more important than gaining insights through induction. Accordingly, he presented Aristotelian cosmology as a strictly deductive system.

In astronomy, Simplicius, like Aristotle, presupposed the geocentrism that was prevalent in antiquity that the Earth was at rest in the center of the universe. With regard to the movements of the stars, however, he deviated from the Aristotelian model, which envisages transparent, uniformly rotating hollow balls (spheres) arranged concentrically around the center of the world, to which the stars are attached, keeping the celestial bodies in their constant orbits. Simplicius thought that this concept was partly superseded by the later astronomical findings presented by Ptolemy. But he did not consider Ptolemy's model to be the final solution either. He was of the opinion that none of the previous theories offered a satisfactory account and explanation of the planetary motions, none was necessarily and demonstrably correct. His own theory also failed to meet his criteria for scientific proof. In contrast to Aristotle, he assumed an axial rotation of all celestial bodies and did not consider their circular movements to be homocentric. According to his idea, only the sphere of the fixed stars revolves around the center of the universe; the planets, which in ancient times also included the Sun and the Moon, perform a more complex motion that involves at least one circular motion that is not centered on the Earth.

Following on from Aristotle, Simplicius distinguished between the approaches of two types of natural scientists: the "physicist" (physicós), by which he meant a natural philosopher, and the "mathematician", i.e. a non-philosopher, who tries to grasp physical conditions with mathematical means. A special case of such a “mathematician” is the astronomer. Both types of researchers study the same subject, but in different ways. The "physicist" inquires into the nature of the celestial spheres and heavenly bodies, he considers them from a qualitative point of view, while the astronomer deals with quantitative points of view, relying on arithmetic and geometrical reasoning. The "physicist" asks about causal connections, the astronomer limits himself to a description that is intended to do justice to the observed phenomena without explaining them causally. Simplicius considered the natural-philosophical, "physical" approach to be the only scientifically profitable one. He believed that astronomers should not be satisfied with devising "hypotheses" – mere rules of calculation – but should use a physical theory well founded by causal argumentation as the starting point for their considerations. Only such a well-founded astronomy can provide real insights. It must be able to explain all observed phenomena, including apparent variations in the size of celestial bodies.

=== Ontology ===
Aristotle said the universe is not located in one particular place. It cannot be localized, because outside of the spherical sky, which is surrounded and delimited by nothing, there is no reality. Simplicius disagreed with this view. He argued that, according to Aristotelian teaching, the circular motion of the celestial sphere was a local motion, that is, a change of place, and that this implied that the heavens were in one place. Simplicius saw the reason for Aristotle's error in the inadequacy of the Aristotelian definition of the term "place". Aristotle had defined place as the boundary between an enclosure and an enclosed. In doing so, he defined it as a two-dimensional surface. Accordingly, the uninhabited heaven could have no place. Simplicius asked whether “enclosure” meant enveloping from the outside or penetrating what was contained. Both lead to a contradiction: if the enclosure penetrates the enclosed, the place is not the limit; if the place only encloses what is contained, it is only the surface of what is contained and not the latter itself in a place, which is absurd.

Simplicius opposed Aristotle's concept with his own understanding of place, that place is a space (χώρα, chṓra) and a "vessel" (ὑποδοχή, hypodochḗ), or an expanded reality affecting all parts of a thing in place. It is not a hollow space and also not – as Proclus thought – an immaterial body, but material and extended. The matter of the place is not the same as that of the body that is in place; rather, they are two different kinds of matter. There is no inconsistency in this, because from Simplicius' point of view nothing stands in the way of a mutual penetration of two matters. Place is not an accident, a property of something (such as spatial extension, which a thing has as one of its properties and which is described in the category under quantity). Rather, it is itself an extended ousia ("beingness", often translated as "substance"). It plays an important role in the world order, for it is the measure that assigns each body its place and within the bodies its parts. Thus, place is not a neutral space in which objects happen to be located, but is the principle of the ordered structure of the entire cosmos and each individual thing. Place does not passively absorb things, but powerfully shapes the relationships between them.

=== Eternity of the world ===
Like Aristotle, Simplicius believed that the spatial extent of the universe was finite. He defended the Aristotelian doctrine of the eternity and indestructibility of the cosmos against the position of John Philoponus, who, as a Christian, accepted creation as the temporal beginning and a future end of the world and justified his view philosophically. One of Philoponus' arguments was that if the world has no beginning in time, an infinite number of days must already have passed. But if the number of days that make up the past is infinite, the present day could never have been reached, for that would have ended a succession of infinitely many days. On the other hand, Simplicius argued that the past years, since they belonged to the past, no longer existed; it is therefore not a matter of traversing a set of infinitely many real – not just potential – existing units, which Aristotle ruled out.

=== Cosmology ===
In his Commentary on the Enchiridion, Simplicius defended Neoplatonic monism, according to which there is only one basic principle called "The One" that is the sole origin of all beings and The Form of the Good, against Manichaeism, a religious doctrine that had been widespread since the 3rd century that offered a dualistic explanation of Good and evil. According to Manichaean dualism, the cosmos is divided between a kingdom of good and a kingdom of Evil, irreconcilable adversaries that are in constant struggle.

Simplicius attacked this cosmogony, accusing the Manichean myths of not being true myths but monstrosities. He also faulted the Manicheans themselves for not understanding that mythical representations are not true in the literal sense, but are to be interpreted symbolically. As a Neoplatonist, Simplicius opposed this Manichean dualism and saw evil (kakón) as merely an absence of good rather than a separate principle in itself. According to Simplicius, following Plato and Aristotle, all striving is aimed at the Good and no one willingly chooses evil; someone who pursues evil either failed to recognize it and went astray, or accepted for the sake of a greater good. Wrong decisions and wickedness in a person are therefore only the result of a lack of insight, not of an evil nature in him. According to Simplicius, even if there were something inherently bad, it would act for its own benefit, that is, for something good. Therefore the world view of the Manicheans is contradictory, as according to their mythology, the kingdom of evil strives in the fight against good to gain some benefit from it; so, it actually wants something good, even though it is said to be absolutely bad. Thus, absolute evil seeks that which is contrary to its own nature, which is absurd for Simplicius.

However, for Simplicius, the error of the Manichaeans also goes back to a legitimate concern: they raised the bad to an independent principle so that they didn't have to trace it back to God, who was supposed to be absolutely good. However, in doing so, the “fell into the fire while fleeing the smoke” by taking up a nonsensical position. The Manichaean idea of a struggle between two original principles presupposes that one principle attacks the other, according to them, good has voluntarily exposed itself to the influence of the opposing power in battle and has suffered losses in the process. This is absurd according to Simplicius' argument: if the good were to behave in this way, it would be unreasonable and incapable and therefore bad. A truly absolute good cannot enter into a fight at all; it is beyond the reach of anything bad.

Simplicius also accused the Manichaeans of taking away from man the realm of what fell within his competence because it relieved him of the responsibility for his ethical decisions and oaths. If an eternal, powerful principle of evil is the cause of evil, then it is also the cause of human error. A person's bad actions can then no longer be traced back to himself, because in this case he is exposed to an overpowering influence and his self-determination is revoked.

=== Ethics ===
According to Simplicius, the Enchiridion is aimed at readers who will implement the advice about the distinction in their lives between "what is up to us" (ta eph' hēmín), and everything else. Simplicius saw his task as a commentator as helping the reader to better understand what "is up to us," the matters about which the soul can make free decisions, which he considered the primary determinant of whether a good life is good and a bad life is bad. Simplicius also addressed potential deterministic and fatalistic objections that may be raised against this concept, that “what is up to us” does not exist at all because human action is determined by coincidences or necessities and not by free will.

In response to Epictetus's view that a student of philosophy should radically turn away from his previous habits, however, Simplicius distanced himself from what he considered unrealistic the demands of radical Stoicism. Here Simplicius applied Plato's metaphor of the irrational "inner child" who strives for sensual pleasure and develops unnecessary fear due to false ideas. According to Platonic understanding, this child should not be killed, but taught and trained, education (Paideia) is "the improvement of the child in us by the educator in us."

=== Psychology ===
In Simplicius' or doctrine of the soul (psyche), he distinguished three types of souls:

- the "first" souls whose abodes are above the lunar sphere in the realm of imperishable bodies. They never descend to earth and know no evil. Since they follow their own nature unhindered, they are exclusively focused on the imperishable good. Therefore, they cannot make wrong decisions. There are no impulses in them that relate to material and transitory things.
- the souls that come from the world of the immortal, but descend to earth and inhabit human bodies there. They occupy an intermediate position between the divine world of pure being and the animal and vegetable world of pure becoming, and have access to both realms. Through their descent, they come into contact with the bad. Losing their exclusive focus on good, they must figure out what is good for them and make decisions prone to error. This can result in them receiving a disposition contrary to their good nature. However, they are able to turn to the good through spiritual effort and thus to realize what is natural for them. Ascending to their homeland beyond the lunar sphere, they are freed from all evils.
- the souls of animals and plants that only know their earthly habitat. In their activities they are always directed towards the physical to which they are related. Since animals lack reason, they are at the mercy of their unreasonable desires. But that's not bad for them, it's natural for them. They follow the urge to preserve life; so they too have something good as their goal. Their way of experiencing evil is graded: in lower animals it is a purely bodily experience, similar to plants; in some higher animals the experience of evils approaches that of man.

The interest that Simplicius brought to the theory of the soul and the question of what was bad was – as with all Neoplatonists – practical. He was concerned with the utilization of the knowledge gained from understanding the soul for application to an ethical lifestyle. According to Simplicius' understanding, man is never helplessly at the mercy of evil; he can always choose the good that corresponds to his natural disposition. Moreover, the area in which bad actually occurs is narrowly limited. Impairments affecting the body do not count as bad in the strict sense, and the presence or absence of material goods is immaterial. Processes of material decay are just as necessary as processes of emergence and make sense within the framework of the world order. The interplay of composition and dissolution of bodies is not in itself a bad thing; if you look at it from a higher perspective and see the whole, it becomes necessary. The only really bad things are bad mental attitudes, because what matters is the immortal soul, not the mortal body. Thus genuine evil does not exist in the nature surrounding man, nor in his circumstances, but only in his soul, and there it can be eliminated through knowledge and a philosophical way of life. In addition, physical imperfections are also limited to a relatively small part of the cosmos. They only occur in the earthly realm, for it is only there that the processes of arising, changing, and passing away take place that allow physical deficiencies to occur. According to the world view of the pagan philosophers of the time, Simplicius believed that becoming and passing away only take place in the "sublunar" space – below the moon. He regarded the entire sky above the lunar sphere as a perfect region, to which everything bad was alien.

== Writings ==
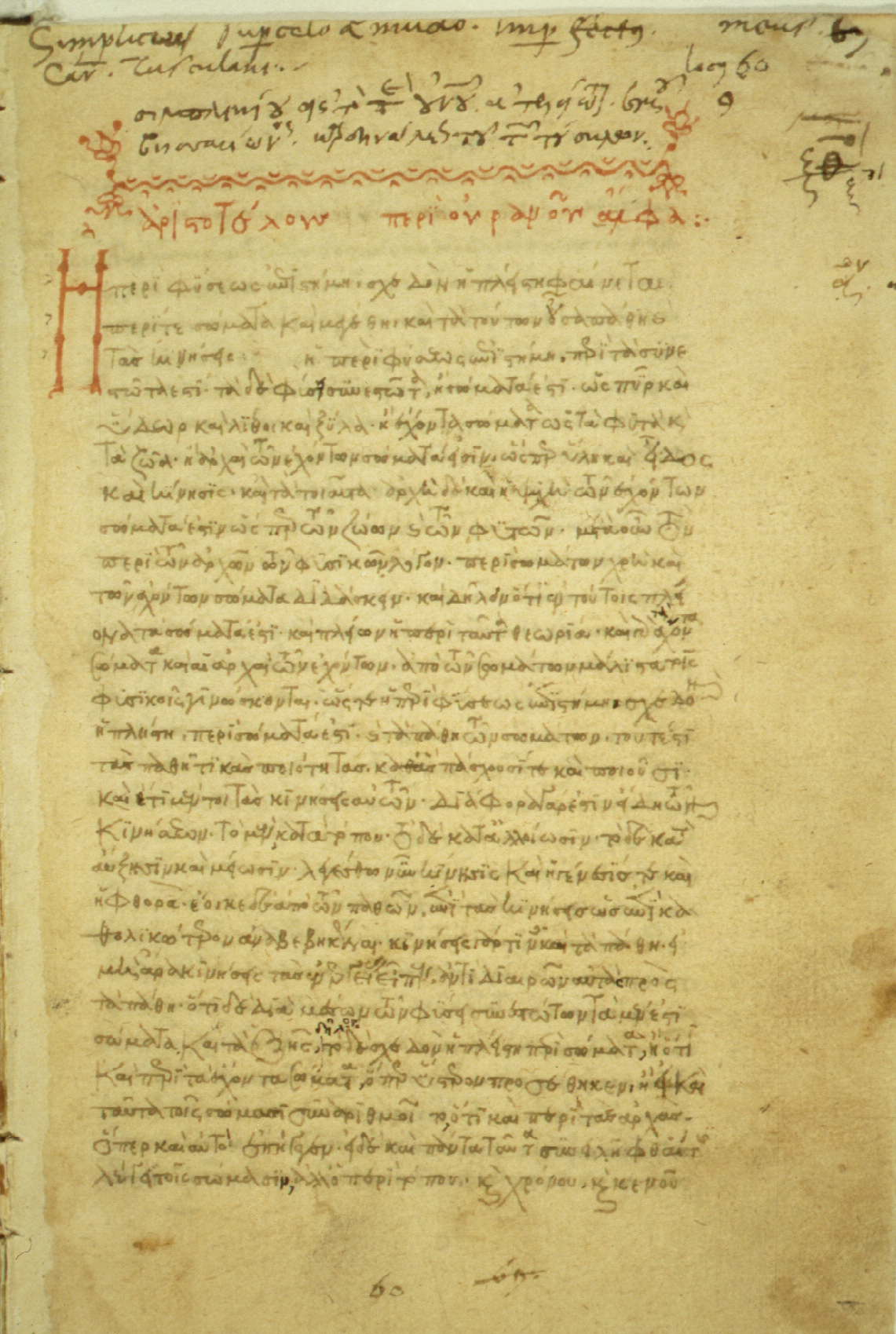
Commentary on Aristotle's De Caelo by Simplicius. This 14th-century manuscript is signed by a former owner, Basilios Bessarion.

His surviving works are commentaries on Aristotle's On the Heavens, Physics, and Categories, as well as a commentary upon the Enchiridion of Epictetus. There is also a commentary on Aristotle's On the Soul that has been transmitted under his name, but many scholars consider it to be stylistically inferior and lacking in the breadth of historical information usually used by Simplicius, suggesting that it was written by Priscian of Lydia. However, other scholars have defended it as an authentic work of Simplicius.

The On the Heavens commentary was written before that on the Physics, and probably not in Alexandria, since he mentions in it an astronomical observation made during his stay in that city by Ammonius. Simplicius wrote his commentary on the Physics after the death of Damascius, and therefore after his return from Persia. When it was that he wrote his explanations of the Categories, whether before or after those on the above-mentioned Aristotelian treatises, it is impossible to ascertain. Besides these commentaries of Simplicius which have been preserved, the On the Soul commentary mentions explanations on the metaphysical books, and an epitome of the Physics of Theophrastus.

=== Commentary on Aristotle's Categories ===
Simplicius begins his commentary on the categories with a preface listing out and summarizing the contributions of his predecessors whose work on the Categories he has consulted: Themistius, Porphyry of Tyre (Isagoge), Alexander of Aphrodisias, Herminus, Maximus of Ephesus, Boethus of Sidon, Lucius Calvenus Taurus, Nicostratus, Plotinus, Porphyry of Tyre (a now lost full commentary), and Iamblichus, stating that he is mostly following Iamblichus, who himself mostly followed Porphyry's (lost) commentary. Following the convention of his predecessors, he then proceeds through a two standard introductory schemes on the philosophy of Aristotle and on the categories itself, and continues through the text of the Categories itself lemma by lemma, for over 400 pages of Greek text.

== Legacy ==
His commentaries can be regarded as the richest in their contents of any that have come down to us concerning Aristotle. But for them, we should be without the most important fragments of the writings of the Eleatics, of Empedocles, Anaxagoras, Diogenes of Apollonia, and others, which were at that time already very scarce, as well as without many extracts from the lost books of Aristotle, Theophrastus and Eudemus: but for them we should hardly be able to unriddle the doctrine of the Categories, so important for the system of the Stoics. It is true he himself complains that in his time both the school and the writings of the followers of Zeno had perished. But where he cannot draw immediately from the original sources, he looks round for guides whom he can depend upon, who had made use of those sources.

In addition, we have to thank him for such copious quotations from the Greek commentaries from the time of Andronicus of Rhodes down to Ammonius and Damascius, that, for the Categories and the Physics, the outlines of a history of the interpretation and criticism of those books may be composed. With a correct idea of their importance, Simplicius made the most diligent use of the commentaries of Alexander of Aphrodisias and Porphyry; and although he often enough combats the views of the former, he knew how to value, as it deserved, his (in the main) sound critical sense. He has also preserved for us intelligence of several more ancient readings, which now, in part, have vanished from the manuscripts without leaving any trace, and in the paraphrastic sections of his interpretations furnishes us with valuable contributions for correcting or settling the text of Aristotle. Not less valuable are the contributions towards a knowledge of the ancient astronomical systems for which we have to thank him in his commentary on the books De Caelo. We even find in his writings some traces of a disposition for the observation of nature.

While some sources mistakenly attribute the coining of the phrase πάντα ῥεῖ (panta rhei), meaning "everything flows/is in a state of flux", to Simplicius, the phrase is first found in this form in the philosophy of Heraclitus. Later on, it can be found in Simplicius' commentary on Aristotle's Physica 1313.11. Variations of it, was current in both Plato and Aristotle's writings.

=== Middle Ages ===
==== Arabic speaking countries ====
In Arabic-speaking countries, Simplikios was known as Sinbilīqiyūs. At least the commentaries on the Categories and on the first book of the Elements of Euclid have been translated into Arabic; in 987 the scholar Ibn an-Nadīm cited them in his Kitāb al-Fihrist. He mentioned the name of Simplicius among mathematicians and astronomers, but also attributed to him a commentary on De Anima, which had been translated into Classical Syriac and also existed in Arabic. The Persian mathematician al-Nayrizi, active in Baghdad in the late 9th century, had extensively quoted the Euclid commentary in his own commentary on the Elements. The writer Ibn al-Qiftī (1172–1248), who dealt with Simplicius in his manual on the history of science, relied on the statements made by Ibn an-Nadīm. He also described him as a mathematician and also claimed that he was respected and had successors who were named after him, so there was a school of Simplicius. The philosopher al-Fārābī, who died in 950 and was a zealous user of ancient thought, apparently used the Categories commentary without ever naming the author. He shared the harmonizing view of Simplicius. Averroes, (1126–1198), in whose works numerous correspondences with texts by Simplicius can be found, never mentioned the Neoplatonist. He was so familiar with his argument against Philoponus that one researcher suggests that he had access to material from the Physics commentary.

==== Western and Central Europe ====
In the 12th century Gerhard of Cremona translated the Euclid commentary of al-Nayrizi into Latin. As a result, the Simplicius quotations contained therein became known in the West. Gerhard rendered the philosopher's name as Sambelichius. Around the middle 13th century, Albert Magnus used Gerhard's translation for his own Euclid Commentary, also adopting material from Simplicius.

The Latin-speaking Late Medieval scholars of Western and Central Europe only had two writings by Simplicius: the commentaries on the Categories and on On the Heavens, which William of Moerbeke had translated into Latin. Moerbeke finished the translation of the Categories commentary in March 1266, that of the commentary on On the Heavens in June 1271. Earlier – in the period 1235–1253 – Robert Grosseteste had made a partial translation of the Commentary on On the Heavens which had a strong influence on philosophers including Thomas Aquinas, Henry of Ghent, Aegidius Romanus and Duns Scotus. Aquinas followed Simplicius' harmonizing interpretation of the relationship between Plato and Aristotle, and made extensive use of Simplicius' commentary on Aristotle's Categories. Petrus de Alvernia used in his commentary on Über den Himmel a wealth of material from the relevant work of his ancient predecessor, and Heinrich Bate in his great handbook Speculum Divinorum et Quorundam Naturalium partly agreeing, partly disagreeing with the theses put forward by Simplicius in his commentary on On the Heavens rather than relying on the authority of Simplicius. From this it can be seen that Simplicius' commentary on Aristotle enjoyed an extraordinary reputation.

Simplicius was presented as an Aristotelian named "Simplicio" by Galileo in his Dialogue Concerning the Two Chief World Systems.

==== Byzantine Empire ====
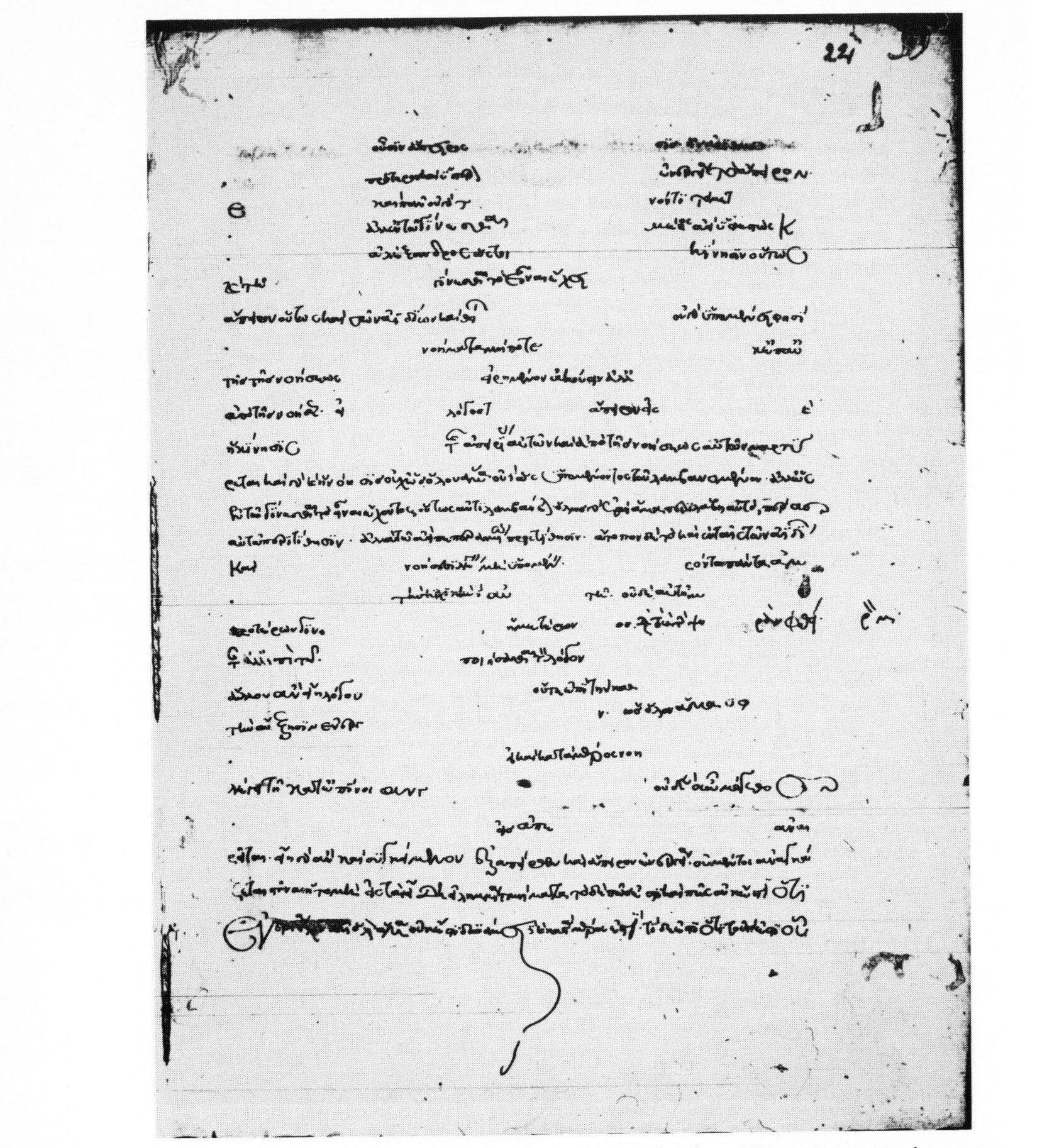
A page of the copy of Simplicius' Commentary on Aristotle's Physics made by Theodora Rhaulaina between 1261 and 1282. Moscow, State Historical Museum, Codex 3649, fol. 221r.

The Byzantine princess Theodora Rhaulaina, a niece of Emperor Michael VIII, copied the Physics commentary of Simplicius in the period 1261–1282. This text-critical Codex has been preserved and is now in the Historical Museum in Moscow. The Byzantine philosopher Georgios Gemistos Plethon († 1452), a Platonist and opponent of Aristotelianism, disapproved of Simplicius' harmonization of Aristotelian and Platonic philosophy. He claimed that Simplicius only undertook this in order to favorably contrast an alleged unity among the pagan philosophers with the disputes among the Christians. However, he did not present anything convincing to support this claim.

=== Modern ===
For Hegel, Simplicius was "the most learned and most astute of the Greek commentators on Aristotle". In Hegel's time, however, several of the works of the Neoplatonist were still unprinted. The first modern critical edition of Simplicius' commentaries on Aristotle was only begun in 1882 by the Berlin Academy of Sciences; The last volume appeared in 1907. The project was led by Hermann Diels. At that time, the commentaries were valued above all as sources for the history of philosophy of earlier epochs and for the ancient reception of Aristotle. From this point of view, Ulrich von Wilamowitz-Moellendorff judged that the "excellent Simplicius" had been "a good man" and that the world could never thank him enough for the preservation of fragments from lost older works.

Simplicius' own philosophical achievement received less attention; the disdain that was widespread in the 19th and early 20th centuries for late antique Neoplatonism, which was then notorious for being too speculative, stood in the way of an unbiased assessment. Eduard Zeller (1903) found the commentaries to be "the work of great diligence and comprehensive erudition" and offer a "careful and mostly reasonable explanation" of the texts interpreted. However, Zeller considered Simplicius' denial of considerable contradictions between Aristotle and Plato to be completely wrong, characterizing as someone a thinker who hardly made an original philosophical achievement, but was only "the thinking editor of a given teaching that has come to its conclusion in all essential respects". Karl Praechter (1927) judged that the commentary tradition exemplified by Simplicius was one of the most attractive phenomena of late antiquity due to its “mutual complementation and tempering of Platonic and Aristotelian ways of thinking”, stressing Simplicius' "love of solid scholarship both in the philosophical and philological-literary areas as well as in the exact sciences".

In the second half of the 20th century, however, research into his teachings intensified. Since then, his comprehensive synthesis of Aristotelian and Neoplatonic ideas has been recognized as an important achievement.

== Bibliography ==
=== Editions ===
The works of Simplicius were printed as a part of Commentaria in Aristotelem Graeca between 1882 and 1907.

=== Works in English translation ===
The works of Simplicius have been translated as part of the Ancient Commentators on Aristotle project between 1989 and 2022.

==== On Aristotle's Categories ====
- Chase, Michael (2003). Simplicius: On Aristotle, Categories 1–4. Duckworth. ISBN 0-7156-3197-7.
- A.J. de Haas, Frans; Fleet, Barrie (2001). Simplicius: On Aristotle, Categories 5–6. Duckworth. ISBN 0-7156-3037-7.
- Fleet, Barrie (2002). Simplicius: On Aristotle, Categories 7–8. Duckworth. ISBN 0-7156-3038-5.
- Gaskin, Richard (2000). Simplicius: On Aristotle, Categories 9–15. Duckworth. ISBN 0-7156-2900-X.

==== On Aristotle's On the Heavens ====
- Hankinson, Robert J. (2001). Simplicius: On Aristotle, On the Heavens 1.1–4. Duckworth. ISBN 0-7156-3070-9.
- Mueller, Ian (2011). Simplicius: On Aristotle, On the Heavens 1.3–4. Duckworth. ISBN 978-0-7156-4063-0.
- Hankinson, Robert J. (2004). Simplicius: On Aristotle, On the Heavens 1.5–9. Duckworth. ISBN 0-7156-3231-0.
- Hankinson, Robert J. (2006). Simplicius: On Aristotle, On the Heavens 1.10–12. Duckworth. ISBN 0-7156-3232-9.
- Mueller, Ian (2004). Simplicius: On Aristotle, On the Heavens 2.1–9. Duckworth. ISBN 0-7156-3200-0.
- Mueller, Ian (2005). Simplicius: On Aristotle, On the Heavens 2.10–14. Duckworth. ISBN 0-7156-3342-2.
- Mueller, Ian (2009). Simplicius: On Aristotle, On the Heavens 3.1–7. Duckworth. ISBN 978-0-7156-3843-9.
- Mueller, Ian (2009). Simplicius: On Aristotle, On the Heavens 3.7–4.6. Duckworth. ISBN 978-0-7156-3844-6.

==== On Aristotle's Physics ====
- Menn, Stephen (2022). Simplicius: On Aristotle Physics 1-8: General Introduction to the 12 Volumes of Translations. Bloomsbury. ISBN 9781350286627.
- Menn, Stephen (2022). Simplicius: On Aristotle Physics 1.1–2. Bloomsbury. ISBN 9781350285682.
- Huby, Pamela M.; Taylor, C. C. W. (2011). Simplicius: On Aristotle Physics 1.3–4. Duckworth. ISBN 978-0-7156-3921-4.
- Baltussen, Han (2011). Simplicius: On Aristotle Physics 1.5–9. Duckworth. ISBN 978-0-7156-3857-6.
- Fleet, Barrie (1997). Simplicius: On Aristotle Physics 2. Duckworth. ISBN 0-7156-2732-5.
- Urmson, James O. (2002). Simplicius: On Aristotle Physics 3. Duckworth. ISBN 0-7156-3067-9.
- Urmson, James O. (1992). Simplicius: On Aristotle Physics 4.1–5, 10–14. Duckworth. ISBN 0-7156-2434-2.
- Urmson, James O. (1992). Simplicius: Corollaries on Place and Time. Duckworth. ISBN 0-7156-2252-8.
- Urmson, James O. (1997). Simplicius: On Aristotle Physics 5. Duckworth. ISBN 0-7156-2765-1.
- Konstan, David (1989). Simplicius: On Aristotle Physics 6. Duckworth. ISBN 0-7156-2217-X.
- Hagen, Charles (1994). Simplicius: On Aristotle Physics 7. Duckworth. ISBN 0-7156-2485-7.
- Bodmar, I.; Chase, M.; Share, M. (2012). Simplicius: On Aristotle Physics 8.1–5. Bloomsbury. ISBN 9781472539175.
- McKirahan, Richard (2001). Simplicius: On Aristotle Physics 8.6–10. Duckworth. ISBN 0-7156-3039-3.

==== On Aristotle's On the Soul ====
- Urmson, James O. (1995). "Simplicius": On Aristotle On the Soul 1.1–2.4. Duckworth. ISBN 0-7156-2614-0.
- Steel, Carlos (1997). Priscian: On Theophrastus on Sense-Perception, with "Simplicius": On Aristotle On the Soul 2.5–12. Duckworth. ISBN 0-7156-2752-X.
- Blumenthal, Henry J. (2000). "Simplicius": On Aristotle On the Soul 3.1–5. Duckworth. ISBN 0-7156-2896-8.
- Steel, Carlos; Ritups, Arnis (2013). "Simplicius": On Aristotle On the Soul 3.6-13. Bloomsbury. ISBN 9781780932088.

==== On Epictetus's Handbook ====
- Brennan, Tad; Brittain, Charles (2002). Simplicius: On Epictetus Handbook 1–26. Duckworth. ISBN 0-7156-3068-7.
- Brennan, Tad; Brittain, Charles (2002). Simplicius: On Epictetus Handbook 27–53. Duckworth. ISBN 0-7156-3069-5.

==== Other works ====
- Furley, David; Wildberg, Christian (1991). Philoponus: Corollaries on Place and Void, with Simplicius: Against Philoponus On the Eternity of the World. Duckworth. ISBN 0-7156-2250-1.
- Lettinck, Paul; Urmson, J. O. (1994). Philoponus: On Aristotle, Physics 5–8, with Simplicius: On Aristotle on the Void. Duckworth. ISBN 0-7156-2493-8.

=== Secondary sources ===
- Barnes, Jonathan (1982). The Presocratic Philosophers [Revised Edition]. London & New York: Routledge Taylor & Francis Group. ISBN 0-415-05079-0.
- Baltussen, Han (12 December 2013). Philosophy and Exegesis in Simplicius: The Methodology of a Commentator. A&C Black. ISBN 978-1-4725-2145-3.
- Bowen, Alan C. (29 November 2012). Simplicius on the Planets and Their Motions: In Defense of a Heresy. BRILL. ISBN 978-90-04-22708-8.
- Falcon, Andrea. "Commentators on Aristotle". In Zalta, Edward N. (ed.). Stanford Encyclopedia of Philosophy. ISSN 1095-5054. OCLC 429049174.
- Hadot, Ilsetraut (1990). "The life and work of Simplicius in Greek and Arabic sources". In Sorabji, Richard (ed.). Aristotle transformed: the ancient commentators and their influence. Ithaca, N.Y. : Cornell University Press. pp. 275–303. ISBN 978-0-8014-2432-8.
- Hoffmann, Phillipe (2010). "Simplicius' Polemics". In Sorabji, Richard (ed.). Philoponus and the Rejection of Aristotelian Science. Institute of Classical Studies, School of Advanced Study, University of London. pp. 57–83. ISBN 978-1-905670-18-5.
- Helmig, Christoph. "Simplicius". In Zalta, Edward N. (ed.). Stanford Encyclopedia of Philosophy. ISSN 1095-5054. OCLC 429049174.
- Sorabji, Richard (8 May 2013). "Simplicius: Prime matter as extension". In Hadot, Ilsetraut (ed.). Simplicius, sa vie, son oeuvre, sa survie (in French, German, and English). De Gruyter. pp. 148–165. doi:10.1515/9783110862041. ISBN 978-3-11-086204-1.
- Sorabji, Richard (2010). "Infinity and the Creation". In Sorabji, Richard (ed.). Philoponus and the Rejection of Aristotelian Science. Institute of Classical Studies, School of Advanced Study, University of London. ISBN 978-1-905670-18-5.
- Vogel, Christian (2013). Stoische Ethik und platonische Bildung. Simplikios´ Kommentar zu Epiktets 'Handbüchlein der Moral' [Stoic ethics and Platonic education. Simplikios' commentary on Epictetus' 'Handbook of Ethics'] (in German). Heidelberg: Winter. ISBN 978-3-8253-6266-9.

=== Further reading ===
- Hadot, Ilsetraut, ed. (8 May 2013). Simplicius, sa vie, son oeuvre, sa survie (in French, German, and English). De Gruyter. doi:10.1515/9783110862041. ISBN 978-3-11-086204-1.
