= Pierre Hadot =

French historian and philosopher (1922–2010)

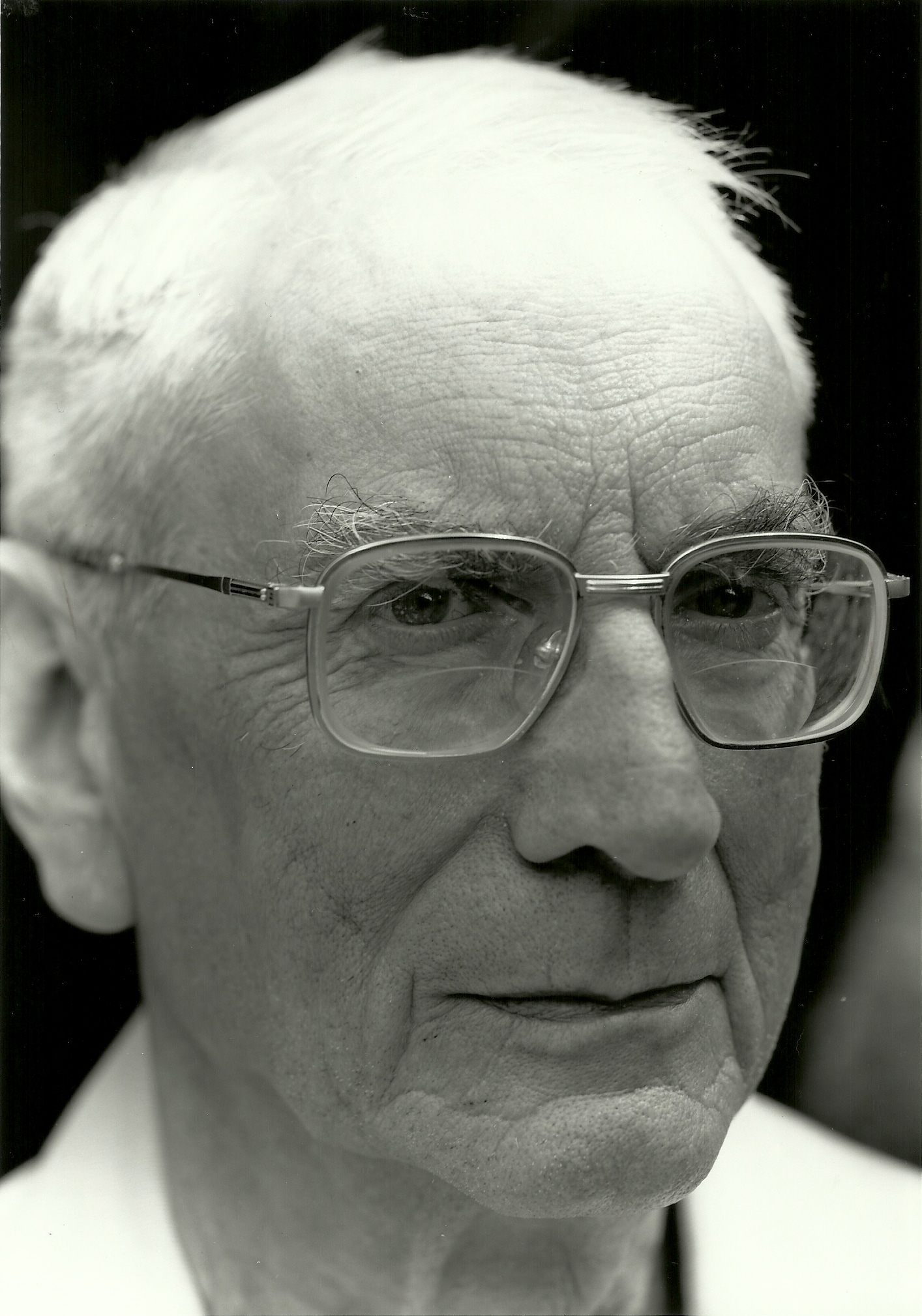
- Born: 21 February 1922; Reims, France
- Died: 24 April 2010 (aged 88); Orsay, France
- Spouse: Ilsetraut Hadot

Education
- Education: École pratique des hautes études University of Paris
- Doctoral advisor: Paul Henry

Philosophical work
- Era: Contemporary philosophy
- Region: Western philosophy
- School: Continental philosophy Philosophy of life
- Institutions: Collège de France
- Main interests: History of ancient Greek philosophy
- Notable ideas: Ancient Greek philosophy as a bios (βίος) or way of life (manière de vivre)

Ecclesiastical career
- Religion: Christianity
- Church: Catholic Church
- Ordained: 1944
- Laicized: 1950

Pierre Hadot (/ɑːˈdoʊ/, French: [pjɛʁ ado]; 21 February 1922 – 24 April 2010) was a French philosopher and historian of philosophy specializing in ancient philosophy, particularly Neoplatonism, Epicureanism and Stoicism.

== Life ==
In 1944, Hadot was ordained a Catholic priest, but following Pope Pius XII's encyclical Humani generis (1950) left the priesthood. He studied at the Sorbonne between 1946 and 1947. In 1961, he graduated from the École pratique des hautes études (EPHE). Hadot received his doctorat ès lettres from the Sorbonne in 1968 under Paul Henry (1906–1984), with a thesis on Porphyry and Gaius Marius Victorinus entitled Porphyre et Victorinus.

In 1964, he was appointed a Director of Studies at EPHE, initially occupying a chair in Latin Patristics, before his chair was renamed "Theologies and Mysticisms of Hellenistic Greece and the End of Antiquity" in 1972. He became professor at the Collège de France in 1983, where he assumed the chair of the History of Hellenistic and Roman Thought. In 1991, he retired from this position to become professeur honoraire at the collège; his last lecture was on 22 May that year. He concluded his final lecture by saying, "In the last analysis, we can scarcely talk about what is most important."

Over the course of his career, Hadot published translations of and commentaries on Porphyry, St. Ambrose, Plotinus, and Marcus Aurelius.

Hadot was married to the historian of philosophy, Ilsetraut Hadot, who assisted him in formulating and extending his knowledge of spiritual exercises. Toward the end of his life, Hadot felt that Epicureanism and Stoicism nourished his life and that of modern society.

== Philosophical work ==
Hadot was one of the first authors to introduce Ludwig Wittgenstein's thought into France. Hadot suggested that one cannot separate the form of Wittgenstein's Philosophical Investigations from their content. Wittgenstein had claimed that philosophy was an illness of language and Hadot notes that the cure required a particular type of literary genre.

Hadot is also famous for his analysis of the conception of philosophy during Greco-Roman antiquity. He identified and analyzed the "spiritual exercises" used in ancient philosophy (influencing the thought of Michel Foucault in the second and third volumes of his History of Sexuality). By "spiritual exercises" Hadot means "practices ... intended to effect a modification and a transformation in the subjects who practice them. The following is an example of a spiritual exercise coined by Epictetus and practiced by ancient philosophers following Stoicism: "What troubles people is not things, but their judgments about things". The Stoics would repeat these aphorisms, committing them to memory, thereby enabling them to use its wisdom the moment they became troubled by a particular thing. Another example comes from Marcus Aurelius: "...my thought can "turn upside down" everything that presents an obstacle to my action, and transform the obstacle into an object toward which my impulse to act ought preferably to tend." "That which impeded action thus becomes profitable to action, and that which blocked the road allows me to advance along the road" These and many other spiritual exercises enabled its practitioners to transform their lives to better conform to nature and to be of service in their community. The philosophy teacher's discourse could be presented in such a way that the disciple, as auditor, reader, or interlocutor, could make spiritual progress and transform himself within." Hadot shows that the key to understanding the original philosophical impulse is to be found in Socrates. What characterizes Socratic therapy above all is the importance given to living contact between human beings.

Hadot's recurring theme is that philosophy in Antiquity was characterized by a series of spiritual exercises intended to transform the perception, and therefore the being, of those who practice it; that philosophy is best pursued in real conversation and not through written texts and lectures; and that philosophy, as it is taught in universities today, is for the most part a distortion of its original, therapeutic impulse. He brings these concerns together in What Is Ancient Philosophy?, which has been critically reviewed. In 1994 Hadot published an article entitled "There Are Nowadays Professors of Philosophy, but not Philosophers", in it Hadot shows us that the American philosopher, Henry David Thoreau, via his book Walden, exemplifies the 'true philosopher', one who lives his philosophy by living simply in natural surroundings.

Much of what Hadot wrote about in his most popular books deals with the personal transformation experienced by people who 'lived philosophy' rather than those who studied philosophy as an academic endeavor. Hadot didn't 'discover' the practice and benefits of 'spiritual exercises' but he 'rediscovered' it and brought it back into modern day philosophical conversation much like previous philosophers did in the past, namely, Erasmus, Montaigne, Descartes, Kant, Emerson, Marx, Nietzsche, William James, Wittgenstein, Jaspers, and Rilke.

== Publications ==
- with P. Henry, Marius Victorinus, Traités théologiques sur la Trinité, Cerf 1960 (Sources Chrétiennes nos. 68 & 69).
- Porphyre et Victorinus. Paris, Institut d'Etudes augustiniennes, 1968. (Collection des études augustiniennes. Série antiquité; 32–33).
- Marius Victorinus: recherches sur sa vie et ses oeuvres, 1971. (Collection des études augustiniennes. Série antiquité; 44).
- Exercices spirituels et philosophie antique. Paris, Etudes augustiniennes, 1981. (Collection des études augustiniennes. Série antiquité; 88). ISBN 2-85121-039-4.
  - Philosophy as a Way of Life. Spiritual Exercises from Socrates to Foucault, edited with an Introduction by Arnold I. Davidson, translated by Michael Chase, Oxford/Cambridge, Massachusetts, Basil Blackwell, 1995, Oxford, Blackwell's, 1995. ISBN 0-631-18032-X.
- La citadelle intérieure. Introduction aux Pensées de Marc Aurèle. Paris, Fayard, 1992. ISBN 2-213-02984-9.
  - The Inner Citadel: The Meditations of Marcus Aurelius, translated by Michael Chase, Cambridge, Massachusetts /London, Belknap Press of Harvard University Press, 1998. ISBN 0-674-46171-1
- Qu'est-ce que la philosophie antique? Paris, Gallimard, 1995. (Folio essais; 280). ISBN 2-07-032760-4.
  - What is Ancient Philosophy?, translated by Michael Chase, Cambridge, Massachusetts /London, Belknap Press of Harvard University Press, 2002. ISBN 0-674-01373-5
- Plotin ou la simplicité du regard (1963); 4e éd. Paris, Gallimard, 1997. (Folio esais; 302). ISBN 2-07-032965-8.
  - Plotinus or the Simplicity of Vision, translated by Michael Chase, with an Introduction by Arnold A. Davidson, Chicago, University of Chicago Press, 1993. ISBN 978-0-226-31194-4
- Etudes de philosophie ancienne. Paris, Les Belles Lettres, 1998. (L'âne d'or; 8). ISBN 2-251-42007-X (recueil d'articles).
- Marc Aurèle. Ecrits pour lui même, texte établi et traduit par Pierre Hadot, avec la collaboration de Concetta Luna. vol. 1 (general introduction and Book 1). Paris, Collection Budé, 1998. ISBN 2-251-00472-6.
- Plotin, Porphyre: Études néoplatoniciennes. Paris, Les Belles Lettres, 1999. (L'âne d'or; 10). ISBN 2-251-42010-X (recueil d'articles).
- La philosophie comme manière de vivre. Paris, Albin Michel, 2002. (Itinéraires du savoir). ISBN 2-226-12261-3.
  - The Present Alone is Our Happiness: Conversations with Jeannie Carlier and Arnold I. Davidson, 2nd ed. Translated by Marc Djaballah and Michael Chase, Stanford / Stanford University Press, 2011 (Cultural Memory in the Present). ISBN 978-0-8047-7543-4
- Exercices spirituels et philosophie antique, nouvelle éd. Paris, Albin Michel, 2002. (Bibliothèque de l'évolution de l'humanité). ISBN 2-226-13485-9.
- Le voile d'Isis: Essai sur l'histoire de l'idée de nature. Paris, Gallimard, 2004. (NRF essais). ISBN 2-07-073088-3.
  - The Veil of Isis: An Essay on the History of the Idea of Nature, translated by Michael Chase, Cambridge, Massachusetts /London, Belknap Press of Harvard University Press, 2002. ISBN 0-674-02316-1
- Wittgenstein et les limites du langage. Paris, J. Vrin, 2004. (Bibliothèque d'histoire de la philosophie). ISBN 2-7116-1704-1.
- Apprendre à philosopher dans l'antiquité. L'enseignement du Manuel d'Epictète et son commentaire néoplatonicien (with Ilsetraut Hadot). Paris, LGF, 2004. (Le livre de poche; 603). ISBN 2-253-10935-5.
- N'oublie pas de vivre. Goethe et la tradition des exercices spirituels, Albin Michel, 2008. (Bibliothèque Idées). ISBN 978-2-226-17905-0.
  - Don't Forget to Live: Goethe and the Tradition of Spiritual Exercise, translated by Michael Chase with a foreword by Arnold A. Davidson and Daniele Lorenzini, Chicago, University of Chicago Press, 2023. ISBN 978-0-226-49716-7
