= Diogenes of Phoenicia =

Neoplatonist philosopher banished from Athens in 529

Diogenes of Phoenicia (Ancient Greek: Διογένης; fl. 529–532) was a 6th-century Greek philosopher. He is known mainly for the fact that Agathias mentions him as one of the seven well-known philosophers who influenced the Academy in its final years. Diogenes was born in Phoenicia, and like most other academy leaders of that time, a native of the Middle East.

Diogenes was one of the philosophers who, after the closure of the Academy in 529, moved to the Sassanid Empire, and took with him a large number of works of Greek philosophy, which eventually ended up being translated into the Syrian, Hebrew, Arabic and Persian languages. The philosophers later returned to the West, but their fates afterwards are unknown.
