= Isidore of Alexandria =

Greek philosopher

Isidore of Alexandria, also called Isidore of Gaza (/ˈɪzɪdɔːr/; also Isidorus /ˌɪzɪˈdɔːrəs/; Greek: Ἰσίδωρος ὁ Ἀλεξανδρεύς; c. 450 – c. 520), was a Greek philosopher and one of the last of the Neoplatonists. He lived in Athens and Alexandria toward the end of the 5th century AD. He became head of the school in Athens in succession to Marinus, who followed Proclus.

== Life ==
Isidore was born in Alexandria. In Athens, he studied under Proclus, and learned the doctrine of Aristotle from Marinus. According to Damascius, "Isidore was awestruck at the sight of Proclus, venerable and marvelous to see; he thought he was seeing in him the very face of true philosophy." Proclus for his part used to "marvel at Isidore's appearance, as it was possessed by the divine and full of the philosophical life within." Damascius further tells us that "Isidore, besides simplicity, loved truthfulness especially, and undertook to be straight-talking beyond what was necessary, and had no pretence in himself whatsoever." The claim made in the Suda that Isidore was the husband of Hypatia, must be in error since Isidore was born long after Hypatia died. It is elsewhere related that Isidore had a wife called Domna, who died five days after the birth of their son whom they named Proclus.

Isidore returned to Alexandria accompanied by Sallustius. In Alexandria he taught philosophy. He was in Athens when Proclus died (in 485), and later when Marinus took over as head (scholarch) of the Neoplatonist school. Marinus persuaded him to be his successor as head of the school, but he left Athens not long after Marinus died, resigning his position to Hegias.

Isidore is known principally as the teacher of Damascius, whose testimony in his Life of Isidore presents Isidore in a very favourable light as a man and a thinker. Damascius' Life, which is dedicated to Theodora, a disciple of both Isidore and Damascius, is preserved in summary form by Photius in his Bibliotheca, and in fragments in the Suda.

== Philosophy ==
It is generally admitted that he was rather an enthusiast than a thinker; reasoning with him was subsidiary to inspiration, and he preferred the theories of Pythagoras and Plato to the unimaginative logic and the practical ethics of the Stoics and Aristotelians. He seems to have given loose rein to theosophical speculation and attached great importance to dreams and waking visions, on which he used to expatiate in his public discourses.
