= Polymnia Athanassiadi =

Greek ancient historian

Academic background
- Education: University of Athens; Somerville College, Oxford
- Thesis: An Emperor and Hellenism: Studies in the Thought and Action of the Emperor Julian (1976)

Academic work
- Discipline: History
- Sub-discipline: Late antiquity, religion and culture
- Institutions: University of Athens

Polymnia Athanassiadi (born 23 September 1946) is a historian specialising in the religious and cultural history of Late Antiquity, in particular the transition from Neoplatonic to Islamic theology. Athanassiadi was a Professor of Ancient History at the University of Athens.

She traveled regularly in the Near and Middle East (from Turkey to Iran) and recorded her journey from Anatolian Turkey to Northern Syria.

== Career ==
Athanassiadi studied philology at the universities of Athens and the Sorbonne, as well as history at Somerville College Oxford, where she completed her DPhil in 1976 entitled An emperor and Hellenism: studies in the thought and action of the Emperor Julian.

She was Professor of Ancient History at the University of Athens from 1986 until her retirement in 2013. She was a fellow of the Centre for Greek Studies at Harvard University (1979-1980), and has held visiting fellowships at the University of Oxford (1990–91), Princeton (1995) and Moscow (1999). She was the Alexander Onassis Public Benefit Foundation Senior Fellow at the universities of Harvard, Columbia, Duke and Berkeley (2004).

In Paris she has given lecture courses at the École Pratique des Hautes Études (2002) and the Collège de France (2006). She edited the series ΄Υστερη Αρχαιότητα for the publisher Κατάρτι and was co-ordinator of the Greek group of the international scientific programme FIGURA. La représentation du divin dans les sociétés grecque et romaine (2008–2011), which was funded by the UMR 8585 (Centre Glotz) des Centre national de la recherche scientifique.

== Selected publications ==
- P. Athanassiadi 1981. Julian and Hellenism: An Intellectual Biography. Oxford: Clarendon Press; 2nd ed., London: Routledge, 1992, repr. 2014; translations into Italian (1984, 1994). Revised in Greek as Ιουλιανός: μια βιογραφία. Athens: ΜΙΕΤ, 2001, 2005.
- P. Athanassiadi 1985. Στο Σύνορο του Ευφράτη (travel writing on Eastern Turkey), Athens, Domos 1985; Athens: Apameia.
- P. Athanassiadi 1991. Πνοές (annotated Greek translation of 99 poems by the oral poet İsmail Emre (1900-1970)). Athens: Domos.
- P. Athanassiadi 1996. Γιουνούς Εμρέ (edition of 51 poems by Yunus Emre with Greek translation), Athens: Apameia.
- P. Athanassiadi 1999. Damascius: The Philosophical History: Text with translation and notes. Athens: Apameia.
- P. Athanassiadi and M. Frede (eds) 1999. Pagan Monotheism in Late Antiquity. Oxford: Clarendon Press.
- P. Athanassiadi 2006. La Lutte pour l'orthodoxie dans le platonisme tardif. De Numénius à Damascius. Paris: Les Belles Lettres.
- P. Athanassiadi 2010. Vers la pensée unique. La montée de l'intolérance dans l'Antiquité tardive. Paris: Les Belles Lettres. Revised in Greek as Η άνοδος της μονοδοξίας στην Ύστερη Αρχαιότητα, Athens: Hestia, 2017, 2018.
- P. Athanassiadi 2015. Mutations of Hellenism in Late Antiquity - Variorum Collected Studies. Farnham: Ashgate.
