= Eulamius =

Athenian philosopher

Eulamius (/juːˈleɪmiəs/; Greek: Eὐλάμιος), born in Phrygia, was, along with Damascius, one of the Athenian philosophers who sought asylum at the court of Khosrau I (r. 531–579) of Persia in 531/532 when Byzantine emperor Justinian I (r. 527–565) closed down the last pagan philosophical schools in Athens. Eulamius was disappointed in Persia and ultimately returned to Byzantium in 532 together with other Greek philosophers, protected by a treaty that guaranteed their safety. His name appears as Eulalios (Greek: Eὐλάλιος) in the Suda and as Eulamios (Greek: Eὐλάμιος) in the historical works of Agathias.

== Sources ==
- Curnow, Trevor (2006). The Philosophers of the Ancient World: an A to Z Guide. London: Duckworth. ISBN 9780715634974.
- Martindale, John R., ed. (1992). The Prosopography of the Later Roman Empire: Volume III, AD 527–641. Cambridge: Cambridge University Press. ISBN 0-521-20160-8.
