= Glossary of Stoicism terms =

Glossary of terms commonly found in Stoic philosophy.

== A ==
adiaphora
ἀδιάφορα: indifferent things, neither good nor bad.
agathos
ἀγαθός: good, proper object of desire.
anthrôpos
ἄνθρωπος: human being, used by Epictetus to express an ethical ideal.
apatheia
ἀπάθεια: serenity, peace of mind, such as that achieved by the Stoic sage.
aphormê
ἀφορμή: aversion, impulse not to act (as a result of ekklisis). Opposite of hormê.
apoproêgmena
ἀποπροηγμένα: dispreferred things. Morally indifferent but naturally undesirable things, such as illness. Opposite of proêgmena.
aretê
ἀρετή: Virtue. Goodness and human excellence.
askêsis
ἄσκησις: disciplined training designed to achieve virtue.
ataraxia
ἀταραξία: tranquillity, untroubled by external things.
autarkeia
αὐτάρκεια: self-sufficiency, mental independence of all things.

== D ==
daimôn
δαίμων: divine spirit within humans.
diairesis
διαίρεσις: analysis, division into parts. Used when distinguishing what is subject to our power of choice from what is not.
dikaiosyne
δικαιοσύνε: justice, "consonant with the law and instrumental to a sense of duty" (Diogenes Laertius 7.98). One of the four virtues (justice, courage, temperance, wisdom/prudence).
dogma
δόγμα: principle established by reason and experience.
doxa
δόξα: belief, opinion.

== E ==
ekklisis
ἔκκλισις: aversion, inclination away from a thing. Opposite of orexis.
ekpyrôsis
ἐκπύρωσις: cyclical conflagration of the Universe.
eph' hêmin
ἐφ' ἡμῖν: up to us, what is in our power, e.g. the correct use of impressions.
epistêmê
ἐπιστήμη: certain and true knowledge, over and above that of katalêpsis.
eudaimonia
εὐδαιμονία: happiness, well-being.
eupatheia
εὐπάθεια: good feeling (as contrasted with pathos), occurring in the Stoic sage who performs correct (virtuous) judgements and actions.

== H ==
hêgemonikon
ἡγεμονικόν: ruling faculty of the mind.
heimarmenê
εἱμαρμένη: fate, destiny.
hormê
ὁρμή: positive impulse or appetite towards an object (as a result of orexis). Opposite of aphormê.
hylê
ὕλη: matter, material.

== K ==
kalos
κάλος: beautiful. Sometimes used in a moral sense: honourable, virtuous.
katalêpsis
κατάληψις: clear comprehension and conviction.
kathêkon
καθῆκον: duty, appropriate action on the path to Virtue.
kosmos
κόσμος: order, world, universe.

== L ==
logikos
λογικός: rational.
logos
λόγος: reason, explanation, word, argument. Also, the ordering principle in the kosmos.
logos spermatikos
λόγος σπερματικός: the generative principle of the Universe which creates and takes back all things.

== N ==
nomos
νόμος: law, custom.

== O ==
oiêsis
οἴησις: opinion, usually arrogant or self-conceited.
oikeiôsis
οἰκείωσις: self-ownership and extension. The process of self-awareness in all animals, which in humans leads to a sense of community.
orexis
ὄρεξις: desire, inclination towards a thing. Opposite of ekklisis.
ousia
οὐσία: substance, being.

== P ==
paideia
παιδεία: training, education.
palingenesia
παλιγγενεσία: periodic renewal of the world associated with ekpyrôsis.
pathos
πάθος: passion or emotion, often excessive and based on false judgements.
phantasiai
φαντασία: impression, appearance, the way in which something is perceived.
phronesis
φρόνησις: prudence, practical virtue and practical wisdom, or, colloquially, sense (as in "good sense", "horse sense").
physis
φύσις: nature.
pneuma
πνεῦμα: air, breath, spirit, often as a principle in Stoic physics.
proêgmena
προηγμένα: preferred things. Morally indifferent but naturally desirable things, such as health. Opposite of apoproêgmena.
proficiens
Latin for prokoptôn.
pro(h)airesis
προαίρεσις: free will, reasoned choice, giving or withholding assent to impressions.
prokopê
προκοπή: progress, on the path towards wisdom.
prokoptôn
προκόπτων: Stoic disciple. A person making progress. Even though one has not obtained the wisdom of a sage; when appropriate actions are increasingly chosen, fewer and fewer mistakes will be made, and one will be prokoptôn, making progress.
prolêpsis
πρόληψις: preconception possessed by all rational beings.
prosochē
προσοχή: attitude and practice of attention, mindfulness. State of continuous, vigilant, and unrelenting attentiveness to oneself (prohairesis)
psychê
ψυχή: mind, soul, life, living principle.

== S ==
sophos
σοφός: wise person, virtuous sage, and the ethical ideal.
synkatathesis (sunkatathesis)
συγκατάθεσις: assent, approval to impressions, enabling action to take place.
sympatheia
συμπάθεια: sympathy, affinity of parts to the organic whole, mutual interdependence.

== T ==
technê
τέχνη: craft, art. The practical application of knowledge, especially epistêmê.
telos
τέλος: goal or objective of life.
theôrêma
θεώρημα: general principle or perception.
theos
θεός: god; associated with the order in the Universe.
tonos
τόνος: tension, a principle in Stoic physics causing attraction and repulsion, and also the cause of virtue and vice in the soul.
