= Hellenistic philosophy =

Period of Western philosophy

Hellenistic philosophy is Ancient Greek philosophy corresponding to the Hellenistic period in Ancient Greece, from the death of Alexander the Great in 323 BC to the Battle of Actium in 31 BC. The dominant schools of this period were the Stoics, the Epicureans and the Skeptics.

== Background ==
The preceding classical period in Ancient Greek philosophy had centered on Socrates (c. 470–399 BC), whose students Antisthenes, Aristippus, and Plato went on to found Cynicism, Cyrenaicism, and Platonism, respectively. Plato taught Aristotle who created the Peripatetic school and in turn had tutored Alexander the Great. Socrates' thought was therefore influential for many of these schools of the period, leading them to focus on ethics and how to reach eudaimonia.

Early Platonism, known as the "Old Academy," begins with Plato, followed by Speusippus (Plato's nephew), who succeeded him as the head of school (until 339 BC), and Xenocrates (until 313 BC). Both of them sought to fuse Pythagorean speculations on number with Plato's theory of forms. The Peripatetic school was composed of philosophers who maintained and developed the philosophy of Aristotle after his death, beginning with Theophrastus (371–287 BC) and Strato of Lampsacus (335–269 BC). They advocated examination of the world to understand the ultimate foundation of things. The goal of life was the eudaimonia which originated from virtuous actions, which consisted in keeping the mean between the two extremes of the too much and the too little.

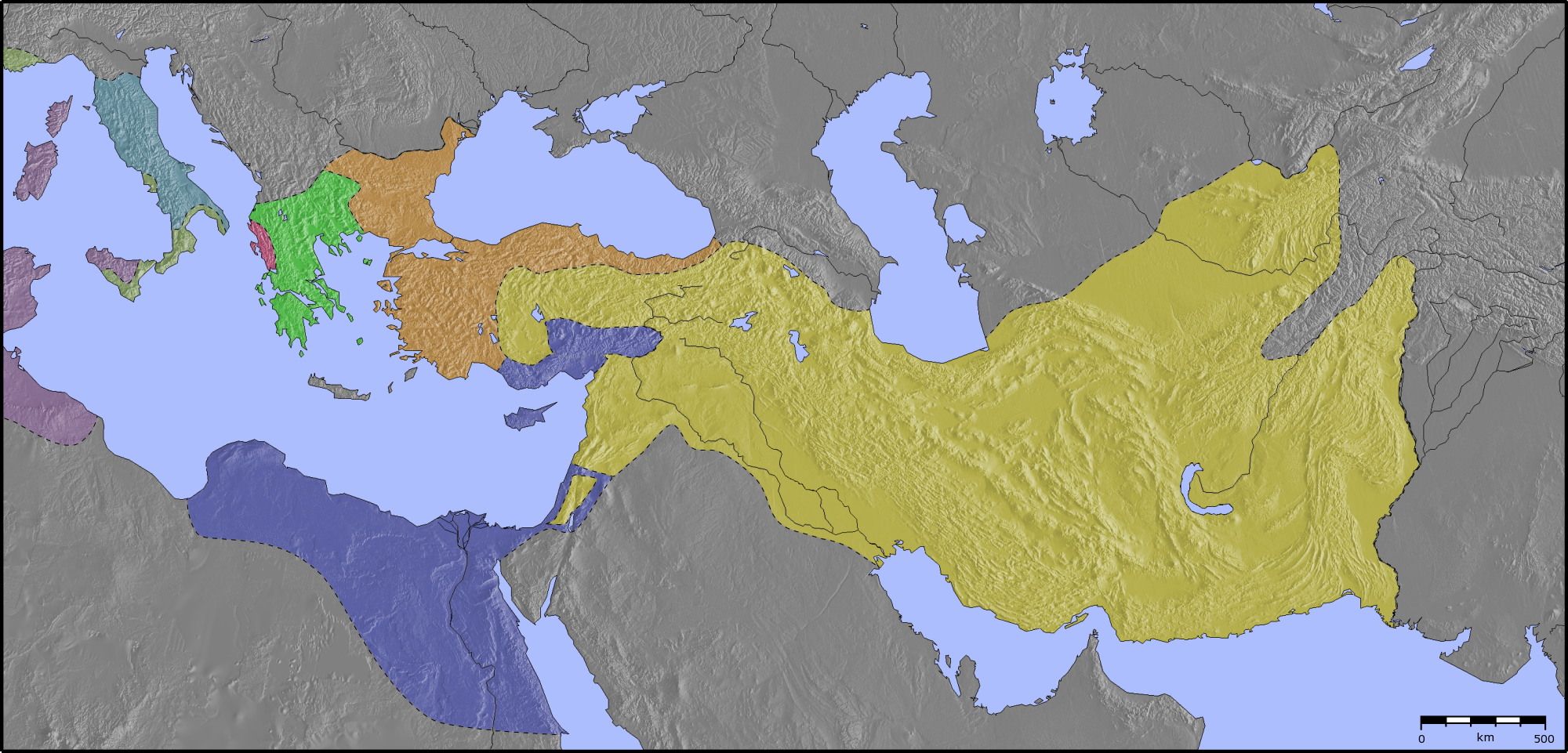
The Hellenistic world in 300 BC

The Hellenistic period began with the death of Alexander and Diogenes in 323 BC, followed by the death of Aristotle the next year in 322 BC. While the classical thinkers were mostly based in Athens, at end of the Hellenistic period philosophers relocated at Rome or Alexandria. The shift followed Rome's military victories from the middle of the second century BC. Sulla's capture of Athens in 87 BC led to destructions and the shipping of Aristotle's manuscripts to Rome. The end of the Hellenistic period does not correspond with anything philosophical, but gradually during the Roman imperial period the predominance of Ancient Roman philosophy becomes perceptible. According to A. C. Grayling, the greater insecurity and loss of autonomy of the era drove some to use philosophy as a means to seek inner security from the external world. This interest in using philosophy to improve life was captured in Epicurus' claim that "empty are the words of that philosopher who offers therapy for no human suffering".

== Socratic schools ==
Many of the Socratic schools continued to exert influence well into the Hellenistic period, including the Cynic, Cyrenaic and Megarian school.

=== Cynics ===
Cynicism, as begun with Antisthenes, followed by Diogenes and Crates of Thebes, advocated purposefully living an ascetic life with only bare necessities in accordance with nature, rejecting all "unnatural pleasures" that were associated with society or its material benefits. Pleasures provided by nature (which would be immediately accessible) were acceptable, however. Crates hence claimed "Philosophy is a quart of beans and to care for nothing". Stoicism would be based on the ethical ideas of the Cynics.

=== Cyrenaics ===
The Cyrenaics, beginning with Aristippus the Younger, the grandson of the founder, argued that the reason pleasure was good was that it was evident in human behavior from the youngest age, because this made it natural and therefore good (the so-called cradle argument). The Cyrenaics also believed that present pleasure freed one from anxiety of the future and regrets of the past, leaving one at peace of mind. These ideas were taken further by Anniceris (fl. 300 BC), who expanded pleasure to include things like friendship and honour. Theodorus (c. 340–250) disagreed with this and instead argued that social ties should be cut and self-sufficiency be espoused instead. Hegesias of Cyrene (fl. 290) on the other hand claimed that life could ultimately not be overall pleasurable.

=== Dialectical school ===
The dialectical school was known for their study of paradoxes, dialectic, and propositional logic. The main philosophers associated with this school were Diodorus Cronus and Philo the Logician Besides studying logical puzzles and paradoxes, the Dialecticians made two important logical innovations, by re-examining modal logic, and by starting an important debate on the nature of conditional statements. Through their development of propositional logic, the Dialectical school played an important role in the development of logic, which was an important precursor of Stoic logic.

== Stoicism ==
Stoicism was founded by Zeno of Citium in the third century BC, asserting that the goal of life was to live in accordance with nature. It advocated the development of self-control and fortitude as a means of overcoming destructive emotions. The name Stoicism derives from the Stoa Poikile (Ancient Greek: ἡ ποικίλη στοά), or "painted porch", a colonnade decorated with mythic and historical battle scenes on the north side of the Agora in Athens where Zeno and his followers gathered to discuss their ideas. Zeno's most influential follower was Chrysippus, who followed him as leader of the school after Cleanthes and was responsible for molding what is now called Stoicism. The Stoics provided a unified account of the world, constructed from ideals of logos, physics, and ethics.

=== Stoic logic ===
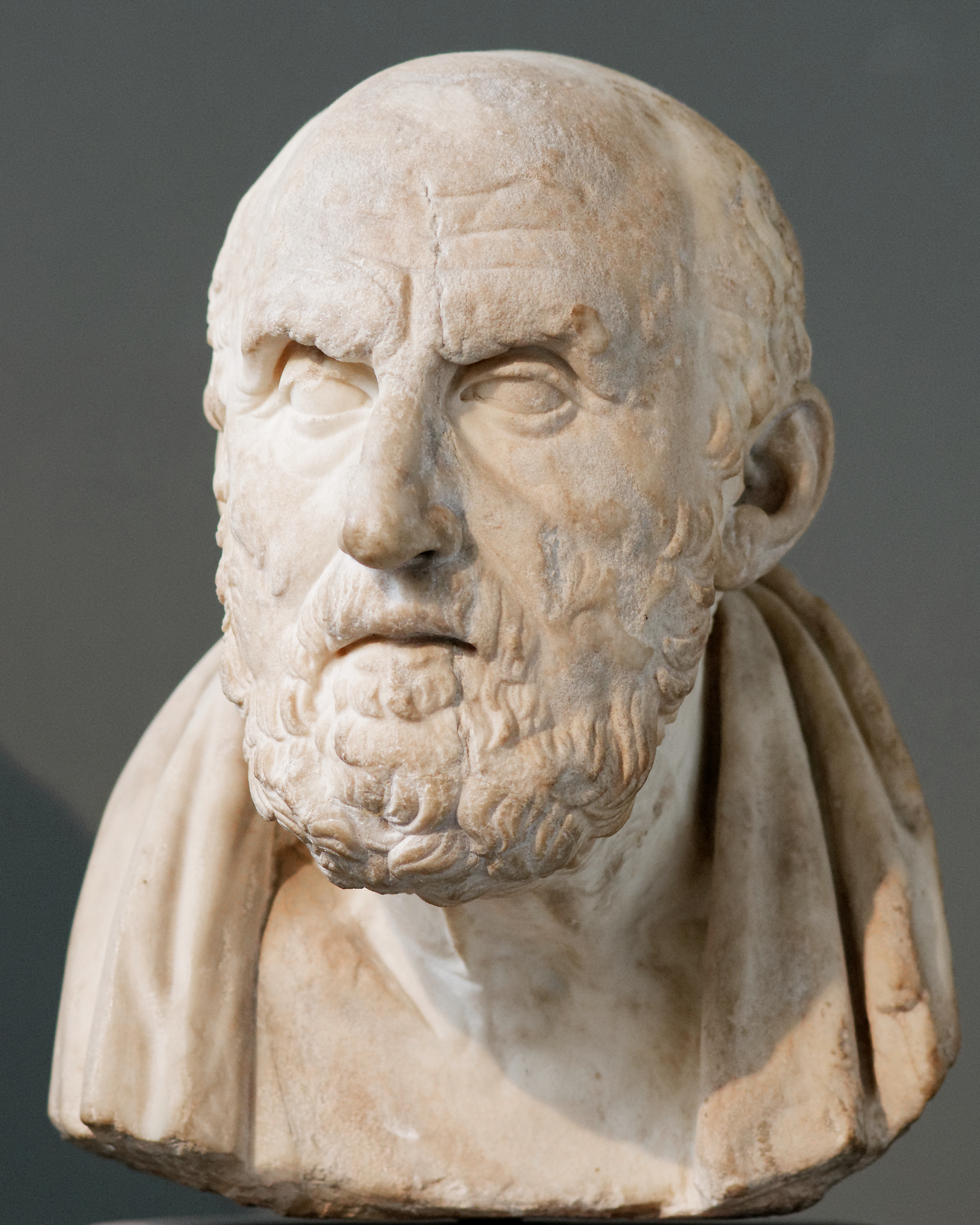
Chrysippus, the third leader of the Stoic school, wrote over 300 books on logic. His works were lost, but an outline of his logical system can be reconstructed from fragments and testimony.

Chrysippus developed a system that became known as Stoic logic and included a deductive system, Stoic syllogistic, which was considered a rival to Aristotle's syllogistic. The Stoics held that all beings (ὄντα)—though not all things (τινά)—are material. Besides the existing beings they admitted four incorporeals (asomata): time, place, void, and sayable. They were held to be just 'subsisting' while such a status was denied to universals. Thus, they accepted Anaxagoras's idea (as did Aristotle) that if an object is hot, it is because some part of a universal heat body had entered the object. But unlike Aristotle, they extended the idea to cover all accidents. Thus, if an object is red, it would be because some part of a universal red body had entered the object.

The Stoics propounded that knowledge can be attained through the use of reason. Truth can be distinguished from fallacy—even if in practice only an approximation can be made. According to the Stoics, the senses constantly receive sensations: pulsations that pass from objects through the senses to the mind, where they leave an impression in the imagination (phantasiai) (an impression arising from the mind was called a phantasma). The mind has the ability to judge (συγκατάθεσις, synkatathesis)—approve or reject—an impression, enabling it to distinguish a true representation of reality from one that is false. Some impressions can be assented to immediately, but others can achieve only varying degrees of hesitant approval, which can be labeled belief or opinion (doxa). It is only through reason that we gain clear comprehension and conviction (katalepsis). Certain and true knowledge (episteme), achievable by the Stoic sage, can be attained only by verifying the conviction with the expertise of one's peers and the collective judgment of humankind.

=== Stoic physics ===
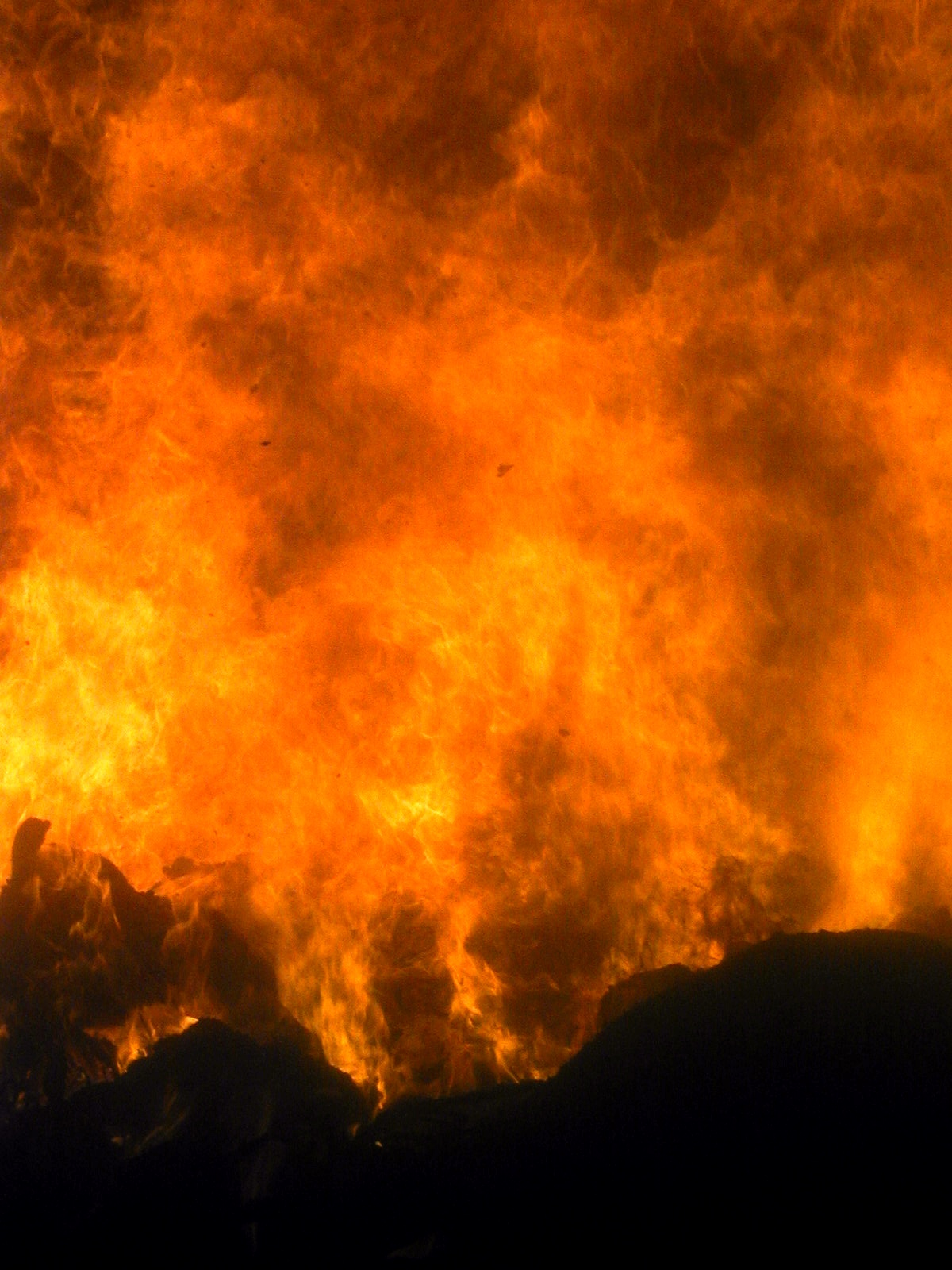
In Stoic physics, the universe begins and ends in a divine artisan-fire.

According to the Stoics, the universe is a material reasoning substance (logos), which was divided into two classes: the active and the passive. The passive substance is matter, which "lies sluggish, a substance ready for any use, but sure to remain unemployed if no one sets it in motion". The active substance is an intelligent aether or primordial fire, which acts on the passive matter. Everything is subject to the laws of fate, for the universe acts according to its own nature and the nature of the passive matter it governs. The souls of humans and animals are emanations from this primordial fire and are likewise subject to fate. Individual souls are perishable by nature and can be "transmuted and diffused, assuming a fiery nature by being received into the seminal reason ("logos spermatikos") of the universe". Since right reason is the foundation of both humanity and the universe, it follows that the goal of life is to live according to reason, that is, to live a life according to nature. Similarly, space and the universe have neither start nor end, rather they are cyclical. The current universe is a phase in the present cycle, preceded by an infinite number of universes, doomed to be destroyed ("ekpyrōsis", conflagration) and re-created, and to be followed by another infinite number of universes. Stoicism considers all existence as cyclical, the cosmos as eternally self-creating and self-destroying (see also eternal return).

=== Stoic passions ===
The foundation of Stoic ethics is that good lies in the state of the soul itself; in wisdom and self-control. One must therefore strive to be free of the passions. For the Stoics, reason meant using logic and understanding the processes of nature—the logos or universal reason, inherent in all things.

	Present	Future
Good	Delight	Lust
Evil	Distress	Fear

For the Stoics, passions are evaluative judgements; a person experiencing such an emotion has incorrectly valued an indifferent thing. A fault of judgement, some false notion of good or evil, lies at the root of each passion. Incorrect judgement as to a present good gives rise to delight (hēdonē), while lust (epithumia) is a wrong estimate about the future. Unreal imaginings of evil cause distress (lupē) about the present, or fear (phobos) for the future. The ideal Stoic would instead measure things at their real value and see that the passions are not natural. To be free of the passions is to have a happiness which is self-contained. There would be nothing to fear—for unreason is the only evil; no cause for anger, for others cannot harm you.

The wise person (sophos) is someone who is free from the passions (apatheia). Instead the sage experiences good-feelings (eupatheia) which are clear-headed. These emotional impulses are not excessive but nor are they diminished emotions. Instead they are the correct rational emotions. The Stoics listed the good-feelings under the headings of joy (chara), wish (boulesis), and caution (eulabeia). Thus if something is present which is a genuine good, then the wise person experiences an uplift in the soul—joy (chara).

== Epicureanism ==
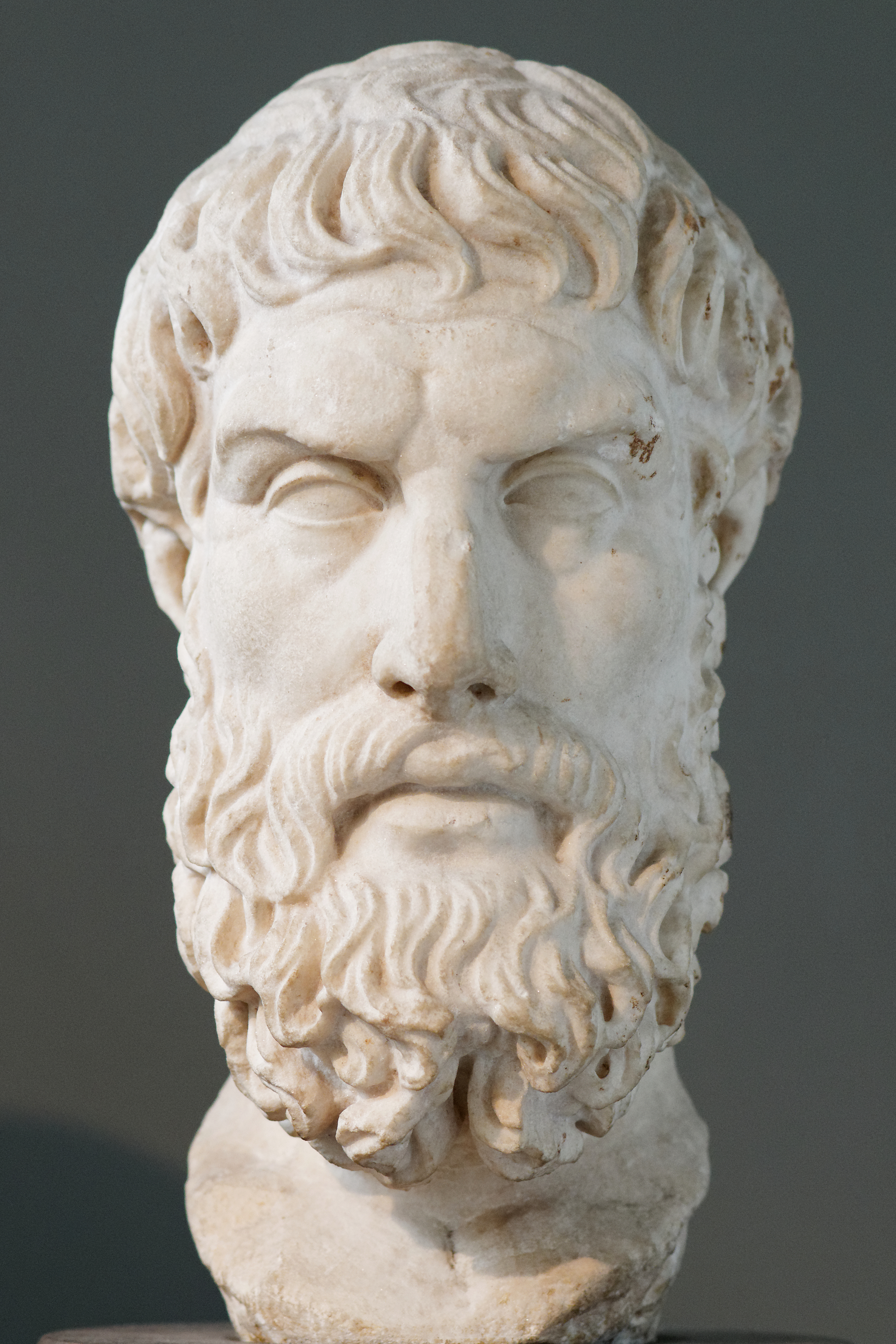
Roman Epicurus bust

Epicureanism was founded by Epicurus in the third century BC.

=== Atoms and void ===
Epicurean physics held that the entire universe consisted of two things: matter and void. Matter is made up of atoms, which are tiny bodies that have only the unchanging qualities of shape, size, and weight. The Epicureans believed that atoms were unchanging because the world was ordered and that changes had to have specific and consistent sources (e.g. a plant species only grows from a seed of the same species), but that in order for the universe to persist, what it is ultimately made up of must not be able to be changed or else the universe would be essentially destroyed.

Epicurus holds that there must be an infinite supply of atoms, although only a finite number of types of atoms, as well as an infinite amount of void. Epicurus explains this position in his letter to Herodotus: When not prevented by other atoms, all atoms move at the same speed naturally downwards in relation to the rest of the world. This downwards motion is natural for atoms; however, as their fourth means of motion, atoms can at times randomly swerve out of their usual downwards path. This swerving motion is what allowed for the creation of the universe, since as more and more atoms swerved and collided with each other, objects were able to take shape as the atoms joined together. Without the swerve, the atoms would never have interacted with each other and simply would have continued to move downwards at the same speed. Epicurus also felt that the swerve was what accounted for humanity's free will. If it were not for the swerve, humans would be subject to a never-ending chain of cause and effect. This was a point which Epicureans often used to criticize Democritus' atomic theory.

Epicureans believed that senses also relied on atoms. Every object was continually emitting particles from itself that would then interact with the observer. All sensations, such as sight, smell, or sound, relied on these particles. While the atoms that were emitted did not have the qualities that the senses were perceiving, the manner in which they were emitted caused the observer to experience those sensations, e.g. red particles were not themselves red but were emitted in a manner that caused the viewer to experience the color red. The atoms are not perceived individually but rather as a continuous sensation because of how quickly they move.

=== Truth of sense-perception ===
The epistemology of the Epicureans was empiricist, with knowledge being ultimately sourced from the senses. Epicurus argued that sensory information is never false, though it may be misleading sometimes, and that "If you fight against all sensations, you will not have a standard against to which judge even those of them you say are mistaken". He responded to an objection to empiricism made by Plato in Meno, according to which one cannot search for information without having some pre-existing idea of what to search for, hence meaning that knowledge must precede experience. The Epicurean response is that prolepsis (preconceptions) are general concepts which allow particular things to be recognised, and that these emerge from repeated experiences of similar things. When we form judgments about things (hupolepsis), they can be verified and corrected through further sensory information. For example, if someone sees a tower from far away that appears to be round, and upon approaching the tower they see that it is actually square, they would come to realize that their original judgement was wrong and would correct their wrong opinion.

=== Pleasure ===
Epicureanism bases its ethics on a hedonistic set of values, seeing pleasure as the chief good in life. Hence, Epicurus advocated living in such a way as to derive the greatest amount of pleasure possible during one's lifetime, yet doing so moderately in order to avoid the suffering incurred by overindulgence in such pleasure. Epicurus actively recommended against passionate love and believed it best to avoid marriage altogether. He viewed recreational sex as a natural but not necessary desire that should be generally avoided. Since the political life could give rise to desires that could disturb virtue and one's peace of mind, such as a lust for power or a desire for fame, participation in politics was discouraged. Further, Epicurus sought to eliminate the fear of the gods and of death, seeing those two fears as chief causes of strife in life.

== Skepticism ==
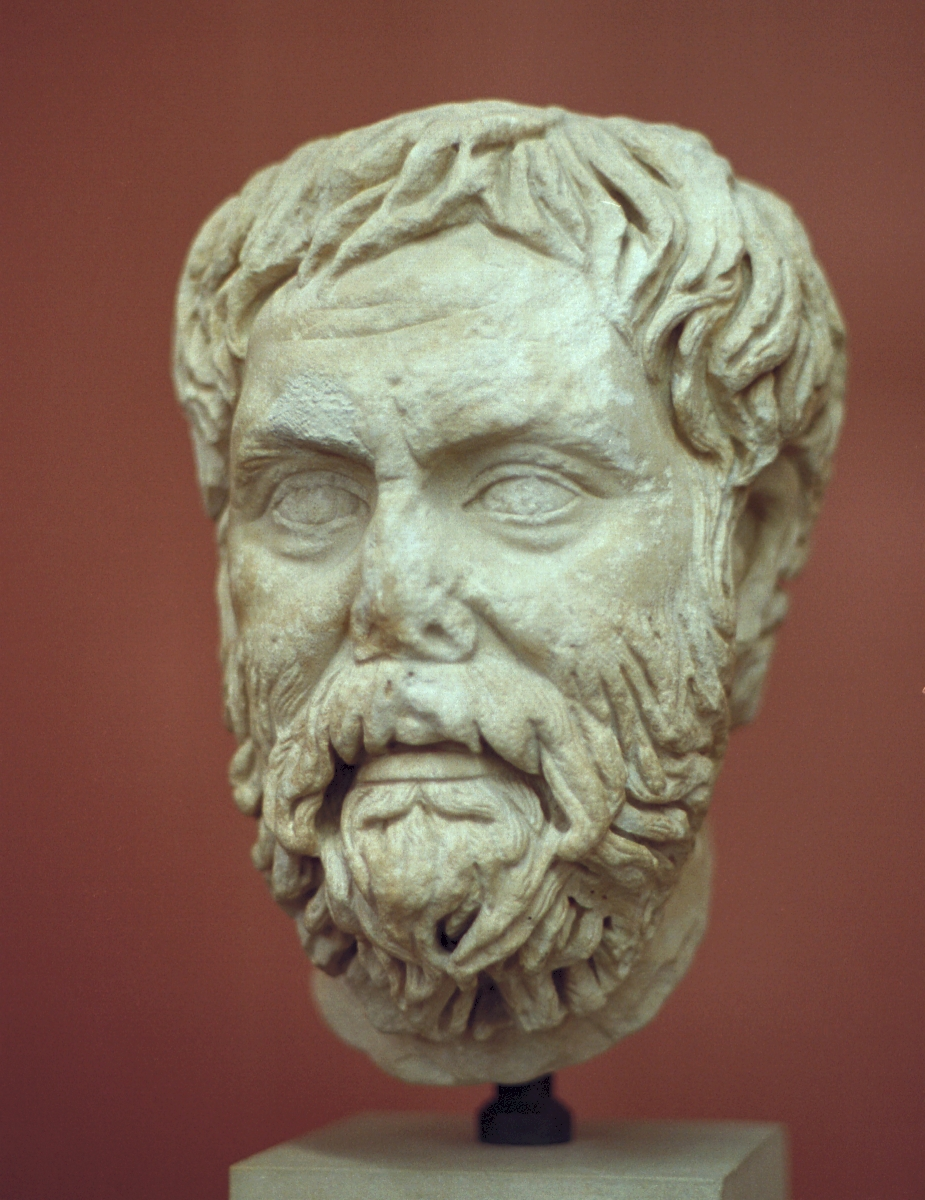
Pyrrho of Elis, marble head, Roman copy, Archeological Museum of Corfu

Greek philosophical skepticism, as a distinct philosophical movement, began with Pyrrho of Elis and Timon of Phlius in the third century BC.

=== Academic skepticism ===
Following the death of Timon of Phlius, When the Platonic Academy became the primary advocate of skepticism dating from around 266 BC, Arcesilaus became its head until the mid-first century BC. While early Academic skepticism was influenced in part by Pyrrho, it grew more dogmatic until Aenesidemus in the first century BC broke with the Academic skeptics and adopted Pyrrhonism, denouncing the Academy as "Stoics fighting against Stoics." The Academic skeptics maintained that knowledge of things is impossible. Ideas or notions are never true; nevertheless, there are degrees of truth-likeness, and hence degrees of belief, which allow one to act. The school was characterized by its attacks on the Stoics and on the Stoic dogma that convincing impressions led to true knowledge. The most important Academics were Arcesilaus, Carneades, and Philo of Larissa. The most extensive ancient source of information about Academic skepticism is Academica, written by Cicero.

==== Middle Academy ====
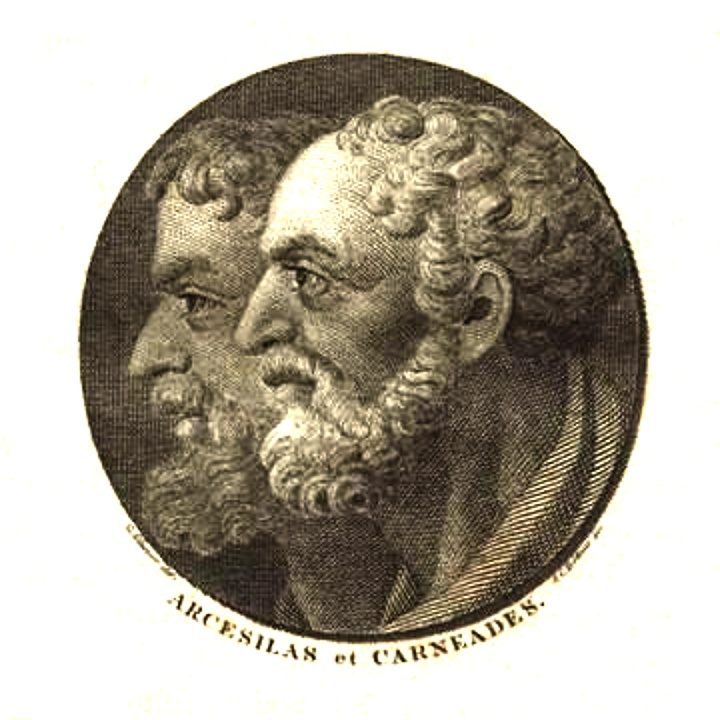
Greek philosophers Arcesilaus and Carneades, from the title page of Cicero's Academica, edited by Johann August Goerenz, 1810

While the objective of the Pyrrhonists was the attainment of ataraxia, after Arcesilaus the Academics did not hold up ataraxia as the central objective. The Academics focused on criticizing the dogmas of other schools of philosophy, in particular of the dogmatism of the Stoics. They acknowledged some vestiges of a moral law within, at best but a plausible guide, the possession of which, however, formed the real distinction between the sage and the fool. Slight as the difference may appear between the positions of the Academics and the Pyrrhonists, a comparison of their lives leads to the conclusion that a practical philosophical moderation was the characteristic of the Academics whereas the objectives of the Pyrrhonists were more psychological.

The Academics did not doubt the existence of truth; they just doubted that humans had the capacities for obtaining it. They based this position on Plato's Phaedo, in which Socrates discusses how knowledge is not accessible to mortals. Up to Arcesilaus, the Platonic Academy had accepted the principle of finding a general unity in all things, by the aid of which a principle of certainty might be found. Arcesilaus, however, broke new ground by attacking the very possibility of certainty. Socrates had said, "This alone I know: that I know nothing." But Arcesilaus went further and denied the possibility of even the Socratic minimum of certainty: "I cannot know even whether I know or not."

The doctrines of Arcesilaus, which must be gathered from the writings of others, represent an attack on the Stoic phantasia kataleptike (criterion) and are based on the skepticism which was latent in the later writings of Plato. Arcesilaus held that strength of intellectual conviction cannot be regarded as valid, inasmuch as it is characteristic equally of contradictory convictions. The uncertainty of sense data applies equally to the conclusions of reason, and therefore man must be content with probability which is sufficient as a practical guide. "We know nothing, not even our ignorance"; therefore the wise man will be content with an agnostic attitude.

==== New Academy ====
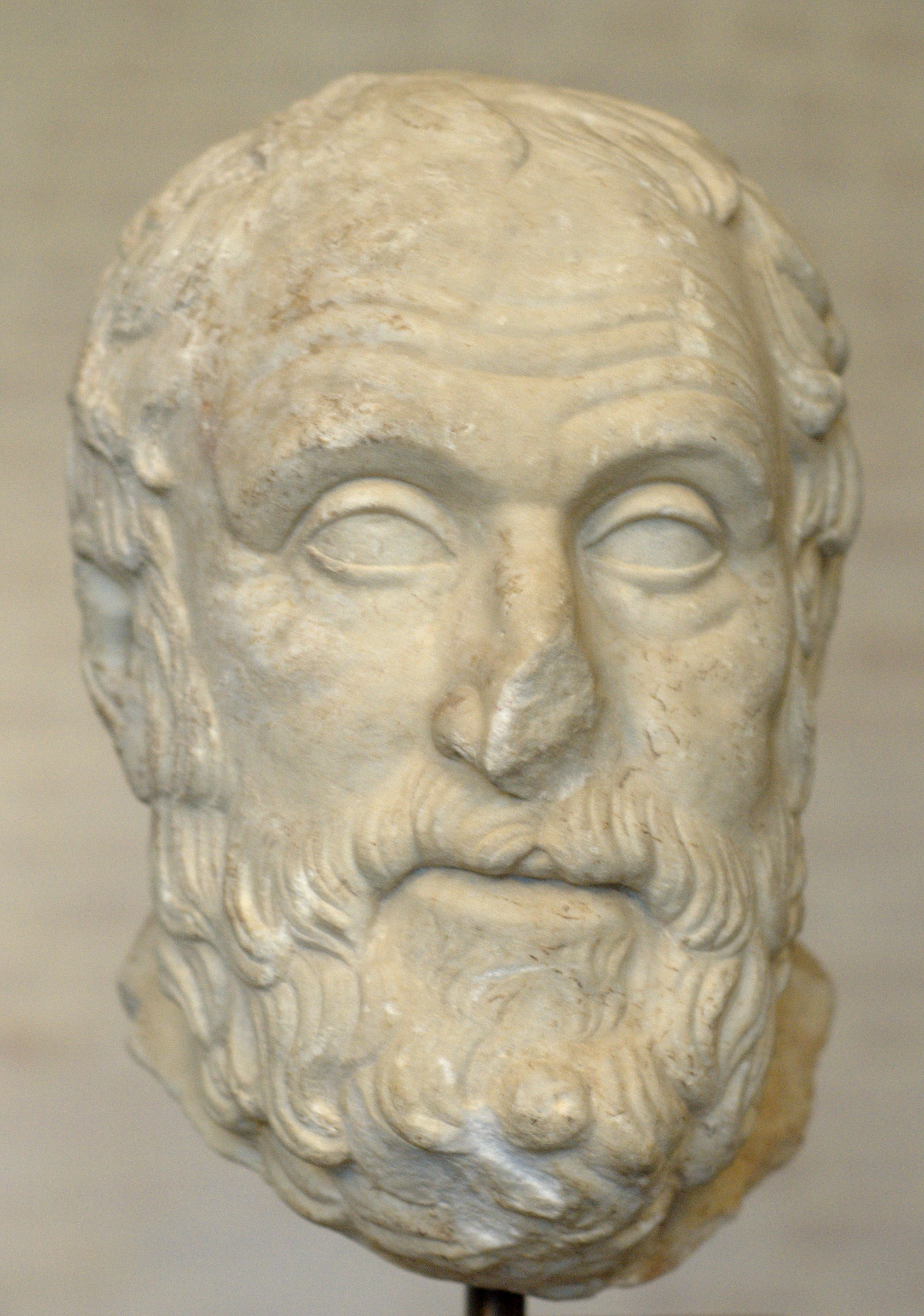
Carneades of Cyrene, the most important of the Academic skeptics

The next stage in Academic skepticism was the moderate skepticism of Carneades, which he said owed its existence to his opposition to Chrysippus. To the Stoic theory of perception, the phantasia kataleptike, by which they expressed a conviction of certainty arising from impressions so strong as to amount to science, he proposed the doctrine of acatalepsia, which denied any necessary correspondence between perceptions and the objects perceived. All our sensations are relative and acquaint us, not with things as they are, but only with the impressions that things produce upon us. Experience, he said, clearly shows that there is no true impression. There is no notion that may not deceive us; it is impossible to distinguish between false and true impressions; therefore the Stoic phantasia kataleptike must be given up. There is no phantasia kataleptike ("criterion") of truth. Carneades also assailed Stoic theology and physics. In answer to the doctrine of final cause, of design in nature, he pointed to those things which cause destruction and danger to man, to the evil committed by men endowed with reason, to the miserable condition of humanity, and to the misfortunes that assail the good man. There is, he concluded, no evidence for the doctrine of a divine superintending providence. Even if there were orderly connexion of parts in the universe, this may have resulted quite naturally. No proof can be advanced to show that this world is anything but the product of natural forces.

Knowledge being impossible, a wise man should practice epoche (suspension of judgment). He will not even be sure that he can be sure of nothing. He saved himself, however, from absolute skepticism by the doctrine of plausibility, which may serve as a practical guide in life. Ideas or notions are never true but only plausible; nevertheless, there are degrees of plausibility and hence degrees of belief, leading to action. According to Carneades, an impression may be plausible in itself; plausible and uncontradicted (not distracted by synchronous sensations but shown to be in harmony with them) when compared with others; plausible, uncontradicted, and thoroughly investigated and confirmed. In the first degree there is a strong persuasion of the propriety of the impression made; the second and third degrees are produced by comparisons of the impression with others associated with it, and an analysis of itself. Carneades left no written works; his opinions seem to have been systematized by his pupil Clitomachus, whose works, which included one on "suspension of judgment", were made use of by Cicero.

By the time of Philo of Larissa, we find a tendency not only to reconcile the internal divergences of the Academy itself, but also to connect it with parallel systems of thought. In general, his philosophy was a reaction against the skeptic or agnostic position of the middle and new Academy in favor of the dogmatism of Plato. Philo of Larissa endeavored to show that Carneades was not opposed to Plato, and further that the apparent antagonism between Platonism and Stoicism was because they were arguing from different points of view.

=== Pyrrhonist revival ===
Pyrrhonism was revived by Aenesidemus in the first century BC. Its objective is ataraxia (being mentally unperturbed), which is achieved through epoché (i.e. suspension of judgment) about non-evident matters (i.e., matters of belief). It is unclear from the surviving evidence how much of its doctrines comprise a revival of older doctrines rather than a development of new ones. Pyrrhonists dispute that the dogmatists—which includes all of Pyrrhonism's rival philosophies—have found truth regarding non-evident matters. For any non-evident matter, a Pyrrhonist makes arguments for and against such that the matter cannot be concluded, thus suspending belief and thereby inducing ataraxia.

Although Pyrrhonism's objective is ataraxia, it is best known for its epistemological arguments, particularly the problem of the criterion, and for being the first Western school of philosophy to identify the problem of induction and the Münchhausen trilemma. Pyrrhonists (or Pyrrhonist practice) can be subdivided into those who are ephectic (engaged in suspension of judgment), zetetic (engaged in seeking), or aporetic (engaged in refutation). Pyrrhonist practice is through setting argument against argument. To aid in this, the Pyrrhonist philosophers Aenesidemus and Agrippa developed sets of stock arguments known as "modes" or "tropes".

== Later schools ==
Around 90 BC, Antiochus of Ascalon rejected skepticism, making way for the period known as Middle Platonism, in which Platonism was fused with certain Peripatetic and many Stoic dogmas. In Middle Platonism, the Platonic forms were not transcendent but immanent to rational minds, and the physical world was a living, ensouled being, the world-soul. The eclectic nature of Platonism during this time is shown by its incorporation into Pythagoreanism (Numenius of Apamea) and into Jewish philosophy (Philo of Alexandria). Hellenistic Judaism was an attempt to establish the Jewish religious tradition within the culture and language of Hellenism.

Pythagorean views were revived by Nigidius Figulus during the Hellenistic period, when pseudo-Pythagorean writings began circulating. By the first and second centuries AD, Neopythagoreanism had emerged as a distinct philosophical movement.

== See also ==
- Alexandrian school
- Hellenocentrism
- Hundred Schools of Thought
