= Prohairesis =

Concept in Stoic philosophy

Prohairesis or proairesis (Ancient Greek: προαίρεσις; variously translated as "moral character", "will", "volition", "choice", "intention", or "moral choice") is a fundamental concept in the Stoic philosophy of Epictetus. It represents the choice involved in giving or withholding assent to impressions (phantasiai). The use of this Greek word was first introduced into philosophy by Aristotle in the Nicomachean Ethics. To Epictetus, it is the faculty that distinguishes human beings from all other creatures. The concept of prohairesis plays a cardinal role in the Discourses and in the Manual: the terms "prohairesis", "prohairetic", and "aprohairetic" appear some 168 times.

== Explanation by Epictetus ==
According to Epictetus, nothing is properly considered either good, or bad, aside from those things that are within our own power to control, and the only thing fully in our power to control is our own volition (prohairesis) which exercises the faculty of choice that we use to judge our impressions. For example, if a person says something critical to us, that is not bad; or, if something complimentary is said, that is not good, because such things are externals and not in our power to control. By exerting the power of choice, it is possible to maintain equanimity in the face of either criticism and praise, which is a moral good. On the other hand, when people become troubled by criticism, or elated by praise, that is a moral evil because they have misjudged impressions by thinking that things not in their power (such as criticism or praise) have value, and by doing that they place a measure of control of their own life in the hands of others.

The importance of prohairesis for Epictetus is that it exerts a power that allows people to choose how they will react to impressions rationally:

Remember that what is insulting is not the person who abuses or hits you, but the judgment that these things are insulting. So when someone irritates you, realize that it is your own opinion that has irritated you. Try, therefore, in the first place, not to be carried away by the impression; for if you once gain time and respite, you will find it easier to control yourself.

By exerting their prohairesis (will, volition, or choice), people can choose rationally how to react to impressions. Prohairesis is the faculty that distinguishes human beings from all other creatures. Epictetus defines it as:

1. a rational faculty able to use the impressions and to which all other human faculties are subordinated (e.g., Discourses II.23.6–15; II.23.20–29)
2. a faculty capable of using impressions and understanding their use (e.g., Discourses II.8.4–8)
3. a self-theoretical faculty able to evaluate all other human faculties (e.g., Discourses I.1.1–13; I.17.1–3; I.20.1–6)
4. a faculty impossible to be enslaved (e.g., Discourses II.10.1; I.17.21) and impossible to subordinate (e.g., Discourses II.10.1; I.17.21; IV.1.161)
