= Sphaerus =

Ancient Greek philosopher

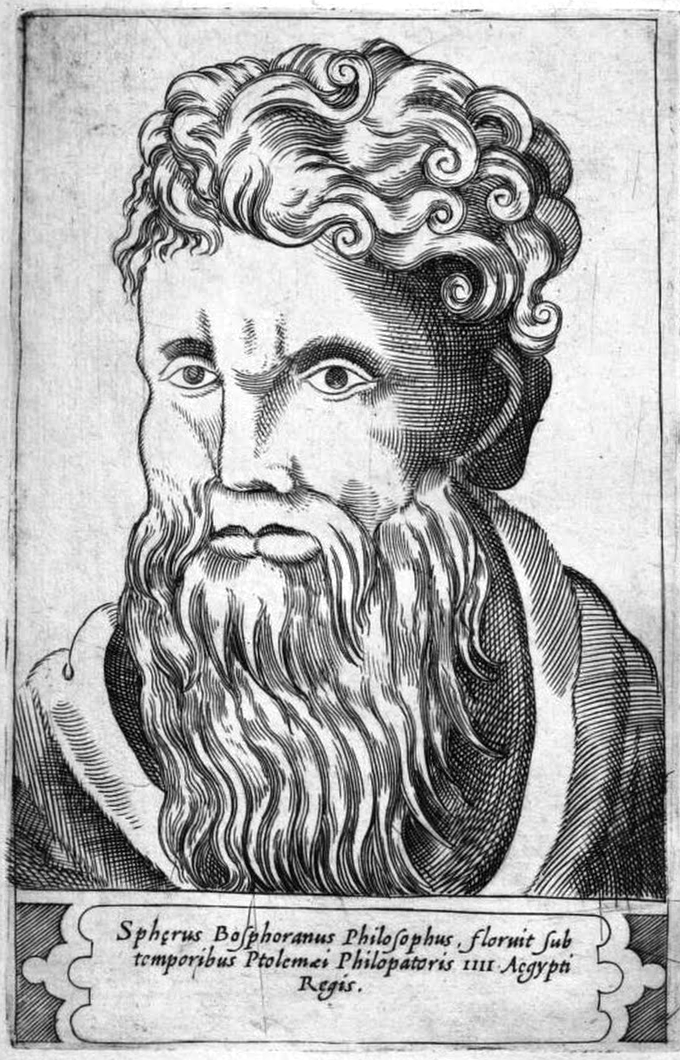
- Engraving by Girolamo Olgiati, 1580
- Born: c. 285 BC
- Died: c. 210 BC
- Era: Ancient philosophy
- Region: Western philosophy
- School: Stoicism

Sphaerus (Greek: Σφαῖρος, sometimes transliterated as Sphaeros; c. 285 BC – c. 210 BC) of Borysthenes or the Bosphorus, was a Stoic philosopher.

== Life ==
Sphaerus studied first under Zeno of Citium, and afterwards under Cleanthes. He taught in Sparta, where he acted as advisor to Cleomenes III. He moved to Alexandria at some point, (possibly when Cleomenes himself was exiled there in 222 BC) where he lived in the court of Ptolemy IV Philopator.

== Ideas ==
Little survives of his works, but Sphaerus had a considerable reputation among the Stoics for the accuracy of his definitions.

Examine the definitions of courage: you will find it does not require the assistance of passion. Courage is, then, an affection of mind that endures all things, being itself in proper subjection to the highest of all laws; or it may be called a firm maintenance of judgment in supporting or repelling everything that has a formidable appearance, or a knowledge of what is formidable or otherwise, and maintaining invariably a stable judgment of all such things, so as to bear them or despise them ... for the above definitions are Sphaerus’s, a man of the first ability as a layer-down of definitions, as the Stoics think.

— Cicero, Tusculan Disputations, iv. 24 [53]

Diogenes Laërtius and Athenaeus tell a story of how he once saved himself from admitting that he had been deceived by a trick played upon him by King Ptolemy:

And once, when there was a discussion concerning the question whether a wise man would allow himself to be guided by opinion, and when Sphaerus affirmed that he would not, the king, wishing to refute him, ordered some pomegranates of wax to be set before him; and when Sphaerus was deceived by them, the king shouted that he had given his assent to a false perception. But Sphaerus answered very neatly, that he had not given his assent to the fact that they were pomegranates, but to the fact that it was probable that they might be pomegranates. And that a perception which could be comprehended differed from one that was only probable.

== Writings ==
According to Diogenes Laërtius, Sphaerus wrote the following works:

- Περὶ κόσμου δύο – On the Universe (two books)
- Περὶ στοιχείων – On the Elements
- [Περὶ] σπέρματος – [On] Seed
- Περὶ τύχης – On Fortune
- Περὶ ἐλαχίστων – On the Smallest Things
- Πρὸς τὰς ἀτόμους καὶ τὰ εἴδωλα – Against Atoms and Images
- Περὶ αἰσθητηρίων – On the Senses
- Περὶ Ἡρακλείτου πέντε διατριβῶν – On Heraclitus (five lectures)
- Περὶ τῆς ἠθικῆς διατάξεως – On the Arrangement of Ethics
- Περὶ καθήκοντος – On Duty
- Περὶ ὁρμῆς – On Impulse
- Περὶ παθῶν δύο – On Passions (two books)
- Περὶ βασιλείας – On Kingship
- Περὶ Λακωνικῆς πολιτείας – On the Lacedaemonian Constitution
- Περὶ Λυκούργου καὶ Σωκράτους τρία – On Lycurgus and Socrates (three books)
- Περὶ νόμου – On Law
- Περὶ μαντικῆς – On Divination
- Διαλόγους ἐρωτικούς – Dialogues on Love
- Περὶ τῶν Ἐρετριακῶν φιλοσόφων – On the Eretrian Philosophers
- Περὶ ὁμοίων – On Things Similar
- Περὶ ὅρων – On Terms
- Περὶ ἕξεως – On Habits
- Περὶ τῶν ἀντιλεγομένων τρία – On Contradictions (three books)
- Περὶ λόγου – On Discourse
- Περὶ πλούτου – On Wealth
- Περὶ δόξης – On Glory
- Περὶ θανάτου – On Death
- Τέχνης διαλεκτικῆς δύο – Art of Dialectics (two books)
- Περὶ κατηγορημάτων – On Predicates
- Περὶ ἀμφιβολιῶν – On Ambiguity
- Ἐπιστολάς – Letters
