= Zeno of Citium =

Hellenistic philosopher, founder of Stoicism (c. 334–c. 262 BC)

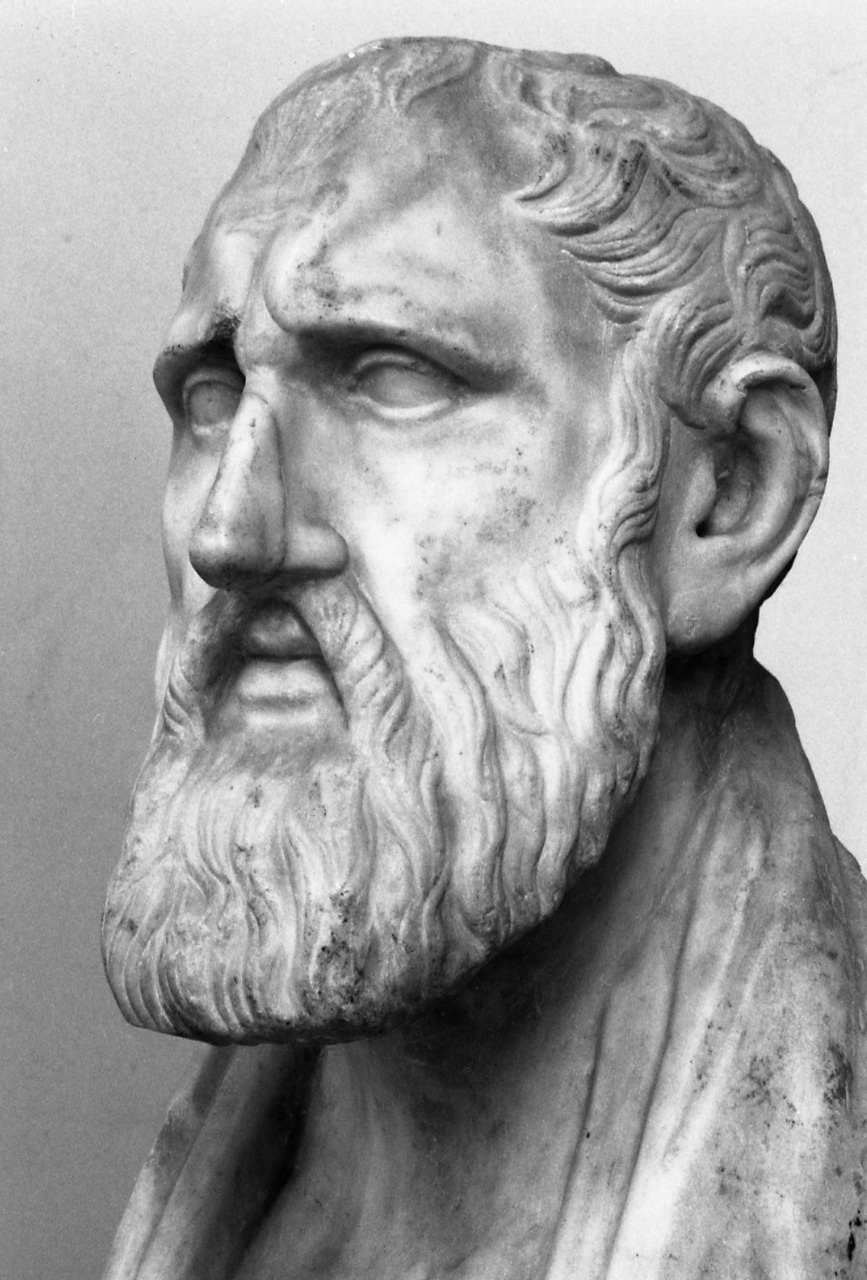
- Zeno of Citium. Bust in the Farnese collection, Naples. Photo by Paolo Monti, 1969.
- Born: c. 334 BC; Citium, Classical Cyprus
- Died: c. 262 BC (aged c. 72); Athens

Philosophical work
- Era: Hellenistic philosophy
- Region: Western philosophy
- School: Stoicism
- Main interests: Logic, physics, ethics
- Notable ideas: Founder of Stoicism, three branches of philosophy (physics, ethics, logic), Logos, rationality of human nature, phantasiai, katalepsis, world citizenship

Zeno of Citium (/ˈziːnoʊ/; Koine Greek: Ζήνων ὁ Κιτιεύς, Zēnōn ho Kitieus; c. 334 – c. 262 BC) was a Hellenistic philosopher from Citium (Κίτιον, Kition), Cyprus. He was the founder of the Stoic school of philosophy, which he taught in Athens from about 300 BC.

Based on the moral ideas of the Cynics, Stoicism laid great emphasis on goodness and peace of mind gained from living a life of virtue in accordance with nature. It proved very popular and flourished as one of the major schools of philosophy from the Hellenistic period through to the Roman era, enjoying revivals in the Renaissance as Neostoicism and in the current era as Modern Stoicism.

== Life ==
Zeno was born c. 334 BC, (Note: The dates for Zeno's life are controversial. According to Apollodorus, as quoted by Philodemus, Zeno died in Arrheneides' archonship (262/1 BC). According to Persaeus (Diogenes Laërtius vii. 28), Zeno lived for 72 years. His date of birth is thus 334/3 BC. A plausible chronology for his life is as follows: He was born 334/3 BC, and came to Athens in 312/11 BC at the age of 22 (Laërtius, § 28). He studied philosophy for about 10 years (Laërtius, § 2); opened his own school during Clearchus' archonship in 301/0 BC (Philodemus, On the Stoics, col. 4); and was the head of the school for 39 years and 3 months (Philodemus, On the Stoics, col. 4), and died 262/1 BC. For more information see Ferguson 1911, pp. 185–186; and Dorandi 2005, p. 38) in the city of Citium in Cyprus.

His ancestry has been described as Phoenician or as Greek, because Citium contained both Phoenician and Greek inhabitants. Such interpretation reflects early post-Victorian scholarship, which often equated culture with ancestry and failed to recognise the distinct, syncretic identity of ancient Cyprus — a society that integrated Greek and Near Eastern influences within its own local traditions. While a number of contemporary and modern historians regard Zeno as a Phoenician, other modern scholars have contested this arguing for a Greek (Note: Claims of Zeno's Phoenician descent are often based on the fact that he was often called "Phoenician" by his contemporaries, but such epithets do not necessarily indicate ethnic origin.) or Greco-Phoenician background. He had a Greek name, a Greek higher education and that there is no evidence he knew a language other than Greek, but in a carbonised papyrus from Herculaneum he is "mocked for his poor command of the Greek language". His father, Mnaseas, had a name ambiguously meaningful both in Phoenician ("one causing to forget") and in Greek ("mindful"). His mother and her name are not recorded.

Zeno received a Greek education and spent most of his life in Athens, where he founded the Stoic school of philosophy. He became a respected figure in Athenian society and was honoured with a public funeral after his death.

Most of the details known about his life come from the biography and anecdotes preserved by Diogenes Laërtius in his Lives and Opinions of Eminent Philosophers written in the 3rd century AD, a few of which are confirmed by the Suda (a 10th-century Byzantine encyclopedia). Diogenes reports that Zeno's interest in philosophy began when "he consulted the oracle to know what he should do to attain the best life, and that the gods' response was that he should take on the complexion of the dead. Whereupon, perceiving what this meant, he studied ancient authors." Parallel to his inquiries, Zeno became a wealthy merchant.

On a voyage from Phoenicia to Peiraeus he survived a shipwreck, after which he went to Athens and visited a bookseller. There he encountered Xenophon's Memorabilia. He was so pleased with the book's portrayal of Socrates that he asked the bookseller where men like Socrates were to be found. Just then, Crates of Thebes – the most famous Cynic living at that time in Greece – happened to be walking by, and the bookseller pointed to him.

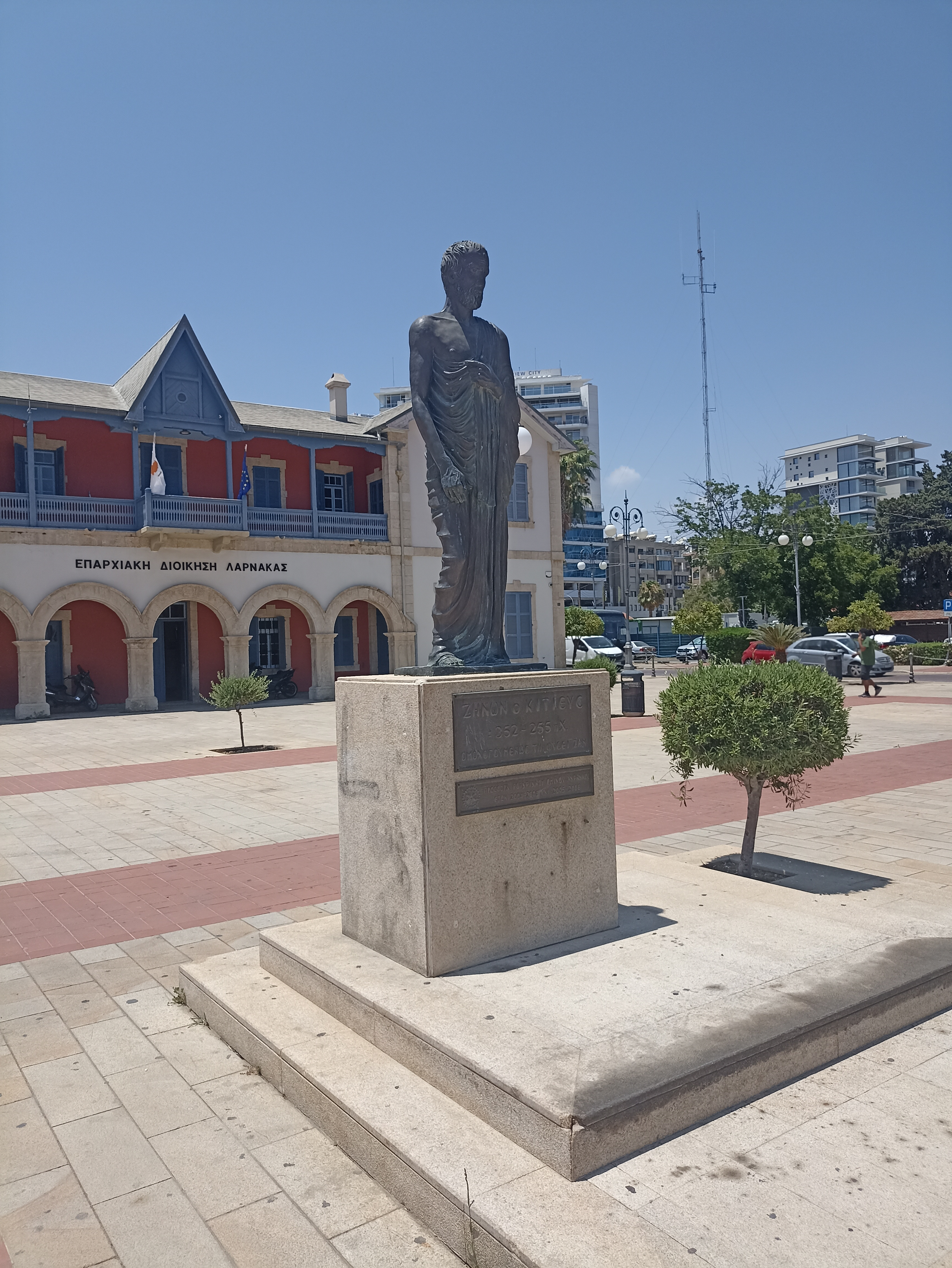
Statue of Zeno of Citium in Larnaca

Diogenes Laërtius describes Zeno as a haggard, dark-skinned person, living a spare, ascetic life despite his wealth. This coincides with the influences of Cynic teaching, and was, at least in part, continued in his Stoic philosophy. From the day Zeno became Crates’ pupil, he showed a strong bent for philosophy, though with too much native modesty to assimilate Anaideia; Cynic “shamelessness” and the disregard for societal norms in favor of freedom. An example of this may be found in the writings of Apuleius who narrates an incident where Crates and Hipparchia, his wife and fellow Cynic, engaged in a public act of sexual intercourse and, as such, drew a crowd. Zeno, upon catching sight of this, covered them both with his cloak so as to prevent bystanders from witnessing the copulating couple, displaying his own inability to be apathetic to the expectations of society. Hence Crates, desirous of curing this defect in him, gave him a potful of lentil-soup to carry through the Ceramicus (the pottery district); and when he saw that Zeno was ashamed and tried to keep it out of sight, Crates broke the pot with a blow of his staff. As Zeno began to run off in embarrassment with the lentil-soup flowing down his legs, Crates chided, "Why run away, my little Phoenician? Nothing terrible has befallen you."

According to his contemporaries, Zeno was attracted only to boys and other men, and Diogenes Laërtius mentions by name at least one with whom he was enamored, a young man named Chremonides (who may or may not be the Athenian statesman and general Chremonides).

Apart from Crates, Zeno studied under the philosophers of the Megarian school, including Stilpo, and the dialecticians Diodorus Cronus, and Philo. He is also said to have studied Platonist philosophy under the direction of Xenocrates, and Polemo.

Zeno began teaching in the colonnade in the Agora of Athens known as the Stoa Poikile (Greek Στοὰ Ποικίλη) in 301 BC. His disciples were initially called "Zenonians", but eventually they came to be known as "Stoics," a name previously applied to poets who congregated in the Stoa Poikile.

Among the admirers of Zeno was king Antigonus II Gonatas of Macedonia, who, whenever he came to Athens, would visit Zeno. Zeno is said to have declined an invitation to visit Antigonus in Macedonia, although their supposed correspondence preserved by Laërtius is undoubtedly the invention of a later writer. Zeno instead sent his friend and disciple Persaeus, who had lived with Zeno in his house. Among Zeno's other pupils there were Aristo of Chios, Sphaerus, and Cleanthes who succeeded Zeno as the head (scholarch) of the Stoic school in Athens.

Zeno is said to have declined Athenian citizenship when it was offered to him, fearing that he would appear unfaithful to his native land, where he was highly esteemed, and where he contributed to the restoration of its baths, after which his name was inscribed upon a pillar there as "Zeno the philosopher". We are also told that Zeno was of an earnest, gloomy disposition; that he preferred the company of the few to the many; that he was fond of burying himself in investigations; and that he disliked verbose and elaborate speeches. Diogenes Laërtius has preserved many clever and witty remarks by Zeno, although these anecdotes are generally considered unreliable.

Zeno died around 262 BC.^{[a]} Laërtius reports about his death:

As he was leaving the school he tripped and fell, breaking his toe. Striking the ground with his fist, he quoted the line from the Niobe:

I come, I come, why dost thou call for me?

and died on the spot through holding his breath.

At Zeno's funeral an epitaph was composed for him stating:

And if thy native country was Phoenicia,

What need to slight thee? Came not Cadmus thence,

Who gave to Greece her books and art of writing?

This signified that even though Zeno was of non-Greek background the Greeks still respected him, comparing him to the legendary Phoenician hero Cadmus who had brought the alphabet to the Greeks, as Zeno had brought Stoicism to them and was described as "the noblest man of his age" with a bronze statue being built in his honor.

During his lifetime, Zeno received appreciation for his philosophical and pedagogical teachings. Among other things, Zeno was honored with the golden crown, and a tomb was built in honor of his moral influence on the youth of his era.

The crater Zeno on the Moon is named in his honour.

== Philosophy ==
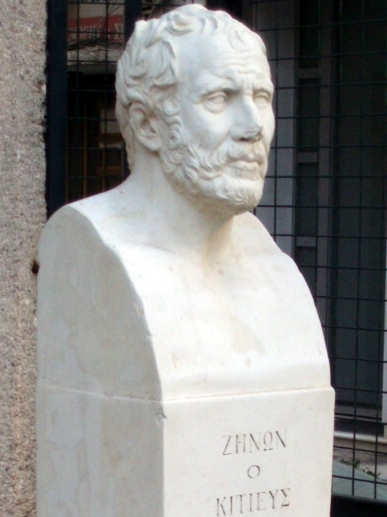
Modern bust of Zeno in Athens

Following the ideas of the Old Academy, Zeno divided philosophy into three parts: logic (a wide subject including rhetoric, grammar, and the theories of perception and thought); physics (not just science, but the divine nature of the universe as well); and ethics, the end goal of which was to achieve eudaimonia through the right way of living according to Nature.

According to anarchist Peter Kropotkin, Zeno was an advocate of anarchist society, without laws, courts, police, temples or public worship, and instead of trade and money, economy based on voluntary gifting.

Because Zeno's ideas were later expanded upon by Chrysippus and other Stoics, it can be difficult to determine precisely what he thought. But his general views can be outlined as follows:

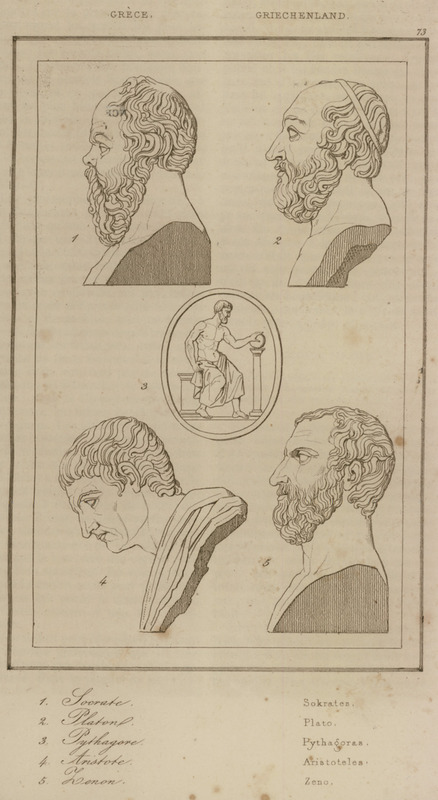
Socrates, Plato, Pythagoras, Aristotle & Zeno by François Pouqueville

=== Logic ===
In his treatment of logic, Zeno was influenced by Stilpo and the other Megarians. Zeno urged the need to lay down a basis for logic because the wise person must know how to avoid deception. Cicero accused Zeno of being inferior to his philosophical predecessors in his treatment of logic, and it seems true that a more exact treatment of the subject was laid down by his successors, including Chrysippus. Zeno divided true conceptions into the comprehensible and the incomprehensible, permitting for free-will the power of assent (sinkatathesis/συνκατάθεσις) in distinguishing between sense impressions. Zeno said that there were four stages in the process leading to true knowledge, which he illustrated with the example of the flat, extended hand, and the gradual closing of the fist:

Zeno stretched out his fingers, and showed the palm of his hand, – "Perception," – he said, – "is a thing like this."– Then, when he had closed his fingers a little, – "Assent is like this." – Afterwards, when he had completely closed his hand, and showed his fist, that, he said, was Comprehension. From which simile he also gave that state a new name, calling it katalepsis (κατάληψις). But when he brought his left hand against his right, and with it took a firm and tight hold of his fist: – "Knowledge" – he said, was of that character; and that was what none but a wise person possessed.

=== Physics ===
The universe, in Zeno's view, is God: a divine reasoning entity, where all the parts belong to the whole. Into this pantheistic system he incorporated the physics of Heraclitus; the universe contains a divine artisan-fire, which foresees everything, and extending throughout the universe, must produce everything:

Zeno, then, defines nature by saying that it is artistically working fire, which advances by fixed methods to creation. For he maintains that it is the main function of art to create and produce and that what the hand accomplishes in the productions of the arts we employ, is accomplished much more artistically by nature, that is, as I said, by artistically working fire, which is the master of the other arts.

This divine fire, or aether, is the basis for all activity in the universe, operating on otherwise passive matter, which neither increases nor diminishes itself. The primary substance in the universe comes from fire, passes through the stage of air, and then becomes water: the thicker portion becoming earth, and the thinner portion becoming air again, and then rarefying back into fire. Individual souls are part of the same fire as the world-soul of the universe. Following Heraclitus, Zeno adopted the view that the universe underwent regular cycles of formation and destruction.

The nature of the universe is such that it accomplishes what is right and prevents the opposite, and is identified with unconditional Fate, while allowing it the free-will attributed to it. According to Zeno's beliefs, "[t]rue happiness" can only be found by obeying natural laws and living in tune with the course of fate.

=== Ethics ===
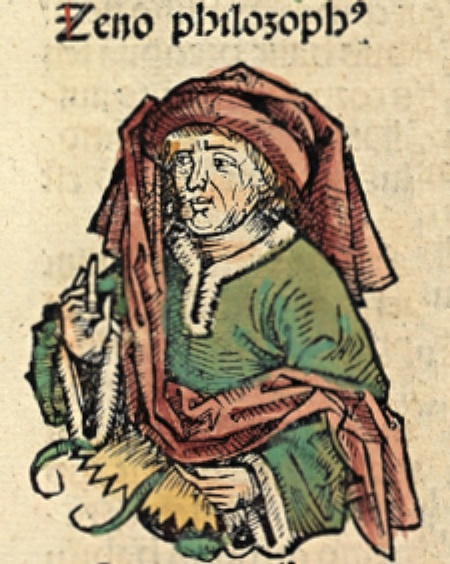
Zeno, portrayed as a medieval scholar in the Nuremberg Chronicle

Like the Cynics, Zeno recognised a single, sole and simple good, which is the only goal to strive for. "Happiness is a good flow of life," said Zeno, and this can only be achieved through the use of right reason coinciding with the universal reason (Logos), which governs everything. A bad feeling (pathos) "is a disturbance of the mind repugnant to reason, and against Nature." This consistency of soul, out of which morally good actions spring, is virtue, true good can only consist in virtue.

Zeno deviated from the Cynics in saying that things that are morally adiaphora (indifferent) could nevertheless have value. Things have a relative value in proportion to how they aid the natural instinct for self-preservation. That which is to be preferred is a "fitting action" (kathêkon/καθῆκον), a designation Zeno first introduced. Self-preservation, and the things that contribute towards it, has only a conditional value; it does not aid happiness, which depends only on moral actions.

Just as virtue can only exist within the dominion of reason, so vice can only exist with the rejection of reason. Virtue is absolutely opposed to vice, the two cannot exist in the same thing together, and cannot be increased or decreased; no one moral action is more virtuous than another. All actions are either good or bad, since impulses and desires rest upon free consent, and hence even passive mental states or emotions that are not guided by reason are immoral, and produce immoral actions. Zeno distinguished four negative emotions: desire, fear, pleasure and sorrow (epithumia, phobos, hêdonê, lupê / ἐπιθυμία, φόβος, ἡδονή, λύπη), and he was probably responsible for distinguishing the three corresponding positive emotions: will, caution, and joy (boulêsis, eulabeia, chara / βούλησις, εὐλάβεια, χαρά), with no corresponding rational equivalent for pain. All errors must be rooted out, not merely set aside, and replaced with right reason.

== Works ==
None of Zeno's original writings have survived except as fragmentary quotations preserved by later writers. The most famous of his works was his Republic, written in conscious imitation of, or opposition to, Plato's Republic. Although it has not survived, more is known about it than any of his other works. It outlined Zeno's vision of the ideal Stoic society.

A manuscript that was attributed to Zeno, matching a known title of one of Zeno's works, Περὶ φύσεως (On Nature), was discovered in 1949 in an Old Armenian translation. In 1956 it was translated into Russian and published with an extensive commentary. Subsequent philological investigation concluded that the author could not have been Zeno and was instead an anonymous Christian philosopher of the late sixth century or a little later, writing in the tradition of ancient philosophy, but doing so as a Christian. He is now known as Pseudo-Zeno. His work shows an integration of Christian and philosophical concepts, but in a very restrained way.

The titles of many of Zeno's writings are, however, known and are as follows:

- Ethical writings:
  - Πολιτεία – The Republic
  - Περὶ τοῦ κατὰ φύσιν βίου – On Life according to Nature
  - Περὶ ὁρμῆς ἢ Περὶ ἀνθρώπου φύσεως – On Impulse, or on the Nature of Humans
  - Περὶ παθῶν – On Passions
  - Περὶ τοῦ καθήκοντος – On Duty
  - Περὶ νόμου – On Law
  - Περὶ τῆς Ἑλληνικῆς παιδείας – On Greek Education
- Physical writings:
  - Περὶ ὄψεως – On Sight
  - Περὶ τοῦ ὅλου – On the Universe
  - Περὶ σημείων – On Signs
  - Πυθαγορικά – Pythagorean Doctrines
- Logical writings:
  - Καθολικά – General Things
  - Περὶ λέξεων
  - Προβλημάτων Ὁμηρικῶν εʹ – Homeric Problems
  - Περὶ ποιητικῆς ἀκροάσεως – On Poetical Readings
- Other works:
  - Τέχνη
  - Λύσεις – Solutions
  - Ἔλεγχοι βʹ
  - Ἄπομνημονεύματα Κράτητος ἠθικά
  - Περὶ οὐσίας – On Being
  - Περὶ φύσεως – On Nature
  - Περὶ λόγου – On the Logos
  - Εἰς Ἡσιόδου θεογονίαν
  - Διατριβαί – Discourses
  - Χρεῖαι

== Editions ==
- Hans von Arnim – Stoicorum Veterum Fragmenta (SVF), I, https://archive.org/stream/stoicorumveterum01arniuoft#page/n3/mode/2up

New title	Leader of the Stoic school 300–262 BC	Succeeded by Cleanthes
