= Kathekon =

Concept in Stoic philosophy

Kathēkon (Greek: καθῆκον) (plural: kathēkonta Greek: καθήκοντα) is a Greek concept, forged by the founder of Stoicism, Zeno of Citium. It may be translated as "appropriate behaviour", "befitting actions", or "convenient action for nature", or also "proper function". Kathekon was translated in Latin by Cicero as officium, and by Seneca as convenientia. Kathēkonta are contrasted, in Stoic ethics, with katorthōma (κατόρθωμα; plural: katorthōmata), roughly "perfect action"

== In Stoicism ==
According to Stoic philosophy, each being, whether animate or inanimate (plant, animal or human), carries on fitting actions corresponding to its own nature, which is the primary sense of kathēkon. The morality of the act resides not in the act itself, but the way in which it is realized.

=== Perfect actions ===
While the acts of a layperson are always misguided (ἁμαρτήματα hamartēmata "mistakes," or peccata), the acts of the sage are always katorthōmata, perfect actions, because the sage acts in view of the good, while the ordinary being (layperson, animal or plant) acts only in view of its survival. Such a katorthōma is done in harmony with all virtues, which the Stoics believed were intertwined, while the layperson may only act in accordance with one virtue, but not all of them. Stoics believe that all virtues are intertwined and that the perfect act encompasses all of them. Stoics often referred to these katorthōmata as kathēkonta which "possessed all the numbers" (pantas apechon tous arithmous), a metaphor for perfection referring to all of the virtues being in harmony. The sage also necessarily carries out katorthōmata: in exceptional circumstances, a sage could carry out a katorthōma which, according to ordinary standards, would be deemed monstrous, such as mutilating himself.

=== Indifferent actions ===
Stoic philosophers distinguished another, intermediary level between kathēkonta and katorthōmata: mesa kathēkonta, or indifferent actions (which are neither appropriate, nor good). A list of kathēkonta would include: to stay in good health, to respect one's parents, etc. Para to kathēkon, or actions contrary to befitting actions, would be the reverse of this type of actions (to insult one's parents, etc.) Intermediary actions refers to "indifferent things" (ἀδιάφορα – adiaphora), which are in themselves neither good nor bad, but may be used in a convenient way or not. Such "indifferent things" include wealth, health, etc. These are not excluded from the domain of morality as one might expect: Cicero thus underlined, in De Finibus Bonorum et Malorum (About the Ends of Goods and Evils, III, 58–59), that when the wise person acts in the sphere of "indifferent things," he still acts conveniently, according to his own nature.

== Bibliography ==
- Long, A. A.; Sedley, D. N. (1987). The Hellenistic Philosophers: vol. 1. translations of the principal sources with philosophical commentary
