= Phantasiai =

Concept in Hellenistic philosophy representing information from sense experience

In Hellenistic philosophy, phantasiai (φαντασίαι) are pieces of information received from sense experience. The Pyrrhonists, Epicureans, and Stoics use the term to refer to information received through the senses and arising in thoughts.

In Stoicism, the phantasiai represent pre-cognitive judgments originating from our previous experiences or our subconscious thinking. The founder of Stoicism, Zeno of Citium, suggested that the soul is imprinted by the senses much in the same way as a signet ring imprints its shape in soft wax; all psychological states and activities, such as mental assent, cognition, impulse, and knowledge are all either extensions or responses to phantasiai. According to Epictetus, the sage avoids doxa, a weak or false belief, by withholding assent when conditions do not permit a clear and certain grasp of the truth of a matter. Some phantasiai experienced in perceptually ideal circumstances, however, are so clear and distinct that they could only come from a real object; these were said to be kataleptikê (fit to grasp). The kataleptic phantasiai compels assent by its very clarity and represents the criterion of truth.
