= Katalepsis =

Concept in Stoic philosophy

Katalepsis (Greek: κατάληψις, "grasping") is a term in Stoic philosophy for a concept roughly equivalent to modern comprehension. To the Stoic philosophers, katalepsis was an important premise regarding one's state of mind as it relates to grasping fundamental philosophical concepts, which was followed by the assent, or adherence to the truth thus understood.

According to the Stoics, the mind is constantly being bombarded with impressions (phantasiai). Some of these impressions are true and some false. Impressions are true when they are truly affirmed, false if they are wrongly affirmed. Cicero relates that Zeno would illustrate katalepsis as follows:

He would display his hand in front of one with the fingers stretched out and say "A visual appearance is like this"; next he closed his fingers a little and said, "An act of assent is like this"; then he pressed his fingers closely together and made a fist, and said that that was comprehension (and from this illustration he gave to that process the actual name of katalepsis, which it had not had before); but then he used to apply his left hand to his right fist and squeeze it tightly and forcibly, and then say that such was knowledge, which was within the power of nobody save the wise man.

Katalepsis was the main point of contention between the Stoics and the two schools of philosophical skepticism during the Hellenistic period: the Pyrrhonists and the Academic Skeptics of Plato's Academy. These Skeptics, who chose the Stoics as their natural philosophical opposites, eschewed much of what the Stoics believed regarding the human mind and one's methods of understanding greater meanings. To the Skeptics, all perceptions were acataleptic, i.e. bore no conformity to the objects perceived, or, if they did bear any conformity, it could never be known.
