= Doxa =

Greek word meaning common belief or popular opinion

Doxa (Ancient Greek: δόξα; from verb δοκεῖν, dokein, 'to appear, to seem, to think, to accept') is a common belief or popular opinion. In classical rhetoric, doxa is contrasted with episteme ('knowledge').

== Etymology ==
The term doxa is an ancient Greek noun (δόξα) related to the verb dokein (δοκεῖν), meaning 'to appear, to seem, to think, to accept'.

Between the 3rd and 1st centuries BC, the term picked up an additional meaning when the Septuagint used doxa to translate the Biblical Hebrew word for "glory" (כבוד, kavod). This Greek translation of the Hebrew scriptures, as used by the early Church, led to frequent use of the term in the New Testament. The word is also used in the worship services of the Greek Orthodox Church, where the glorification of God in true worship is also seen as true belief. In that context, doxa reflects behavior or practice in worship, and the belief of the whole church rather than personal opinion. The unification of these multiple meanings of doxa emerges in the modern terms orthodoxy and heterodoxy. This semantic merging in the word doxa is also seen in the Russian word slava (слава), which means 'glory', but is used with the meaning of praise or worship in words like pravoslavie (православие), meaning "orthodoxy" (or, literally, "true belief", "true way of worship") related to the verb 'славить' – "to praise" but calqued from the Greek ὀρθοδοξία (orthodoxia).

== In philosophy ==
=== Plato ===
In his dialogue Gorgias, Plato presents the sophists as wordsmiths who ensnared and used the malleable doxa of the multitude to their advantage without shame. In this and other writings, Plato relegated doxa as being a belief, unrelated to reason, that resided in the unreasoning, lower-parts of the soul.

This viewpoint extended into the concept of doxasta in Plato's theory of forms, which states that physical objects are manifestations of doxa and are thus not in their true form. Plato's framing of doxa as the opponent of knowledge led to the classical opposition of error to truth, which has since become a major concern in Western philosophy. (However, in the Theaetetus and in the Meno, Plato has Socrates suggest that knowledge is orthos doxa for which one can provide a logos, thus initiating the traditional definition of knowledge as "justified true belief.") Thus, error is considered as pure negative, which can take various forms, among them the form of illusion.

While doxa is used as a tool for the formation of arguments, it is also formed by argument. The former can be understood as told by James A. Herrick in The History and Theory of Rhetoric: An Introduction:

The Sophists in Gorgias hold that rhetoric creates truth that is useful for the moment out of doxa, or the opinions of the people, through the process of argument and counterargument. Socrates will have no part of this sort of 'truth' which, nevertheless, is essential to a democracy.

Importantly noted, democracy, which by definition is the manifestation of public opinion, is dependent upon (and therefore also constrained by) the same limits imposed upon the individuals responsible for its establishment. Due to compromised opinions within a society, as well as opinions not counted for due to inaccessibility and apathy, doxa is not homogeneous, nor is it created agreeably. Rather, it is pliable and imperfect—the outcome of an ongoing power struggle between clashing "truths."

=== Aristotle ===
Aristotle, Plato's student, objected to Plato's theory of doxa. Aristotle perceived that doxa's value was in practicality and common usage, in contrast with Plato's philosophical purity relegating doxa to deception. Further, Aristotle held doxa as the first step in finding knowledge (episteme), as doxa had found applications in the physical world, whereby those who held it had a great number of tests done to prove it and thus reason to believe it. Aristotle clarifies this by categorizing the accepted truths of the physical world that are passed down from generation to generation as endoxa. Endoxa is a more stable belief than doxa, because it has been "tested" in argumentative struggles in the Polis by prior interlocutors. The term endoxa is used in Aristotle's Organon, Topics and Rhetoric.

Aristotle conceives of doxa as a type of hupolêpsis. Knowledge also falls under this category. Categorizing doxa, or opinion, with knowledge suggests that doxa is rational.

=== Epicurus ===
The Principal Doctrines (Kyriai Doxai) are the main beliefs of the Epicurean school of Hellenistic philosophy, and constitute Epicurean orthodoxy. They are believed to be the authoritative conclusions arrived at by Epicurus, Metrodorus, and their close companions during the early years of the formation of the school, which were compiled into an epitome for the benefit of their disciples.

== Contemporary interpretations ==
=== In sociology and anthropology (Bourdieu) ===
Pierre Bourdieu, in his Outline of a Theory of Practice (1972), used the term doxa to denote a society's taken-for-granted, unquestioned truths. In comparison, opinion is the sphere of that which may be openly contested and discussed. Bourdieu believes that doxa derives from socialization, as socialization also deals with beliefs that derive from society; as we grow up in the environment, we tend to believe what society tells us is correct. Adding on to his previous example, Bourdieu contends that it is a socially-accepted misconception that if you do not score as high as someone else, then you are obviously not as smart as they are. Scores do not prove that one is smarter, because there are many different factors that play into what you score on a test. People may excel within a certain topic and fail at another. However, even though it is a misconception, people tend to partake in common practices to make themselves feel better. In the case of common beliefs in school, the students who feel inferior due to popular belief that they are not as smart as the students who score higher than they, may use drugs to ease the insecurities they face. Bourdieu believes that doxa is more than common belief: it also has the potential to give rise to common action. This calls to attention that the notion of social order as naturally occurring is misperceived, disregarding its creation by political argumentation. Doxa, then, can be understood as created by argument as well as used in the formation of argument, essential for the establishment of democratic policies.

== See also ==
- Episteme
- Common sense
- Dogma
- Idola tribus
- Doxa of Parmenides
- Public opinion
- Vox populi
- Hoi polloi
- Conventional wisdom
