= Percy Ewing Matheson =

British scholar and author (1859–1946)

Percy Ewing Matheson MBE (23 January 1859 – 11 May 1946) was a writer and honorary fellow of New College, Oxford.

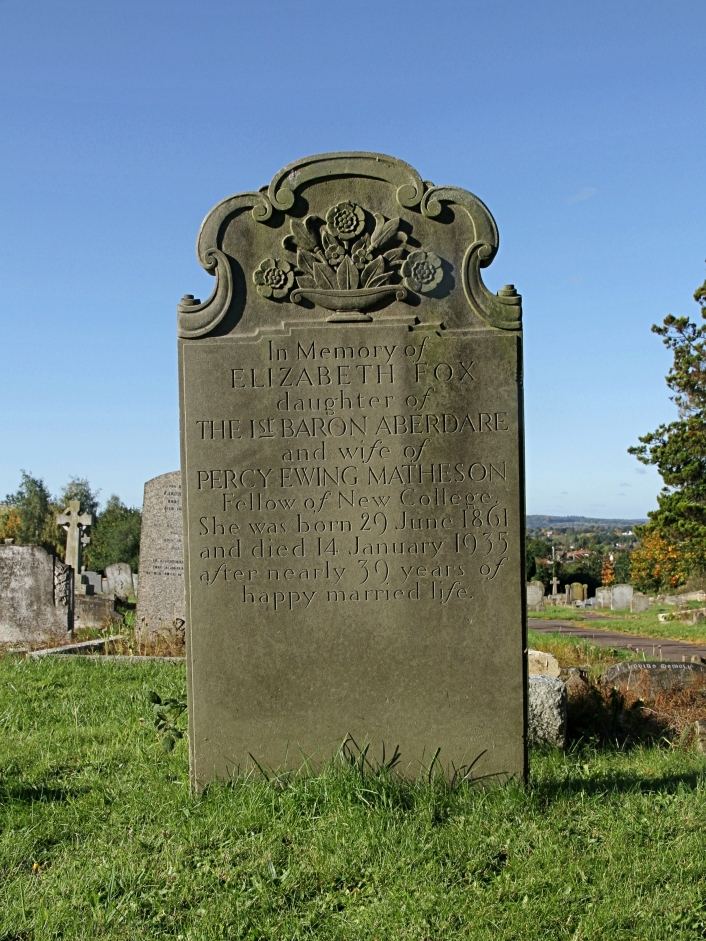
Headstone of Matheson's wife in Headington Cemetery, Oxford

Matheson's wife Elizabeth was a daughter of Henry Bruce, 1st Baron Aberdare, and predeceased her husband in 1935.

== Selected works ==
- A skeleton outline of Roman history (1885)
- (transl.) The Theory of the State by Johann Caspar Bluntschli (1885)
- National ideals (1915)
- (transl.) Epictetus. The Discourses and Manual, together with fragments of his writings in 3 vols. (1916)
- Holy Russia and Other Poems (1918)
- The growth of Rome (1922)
- "James Joseph Sylvester" . Dictionary of National Biography. London: Smith, Elder & Co. 1885–1900.
