= Altercatio Hadriani Augusti et Epicteti philosophi =

Latin dialogue featuring Hadrian and Epictetus

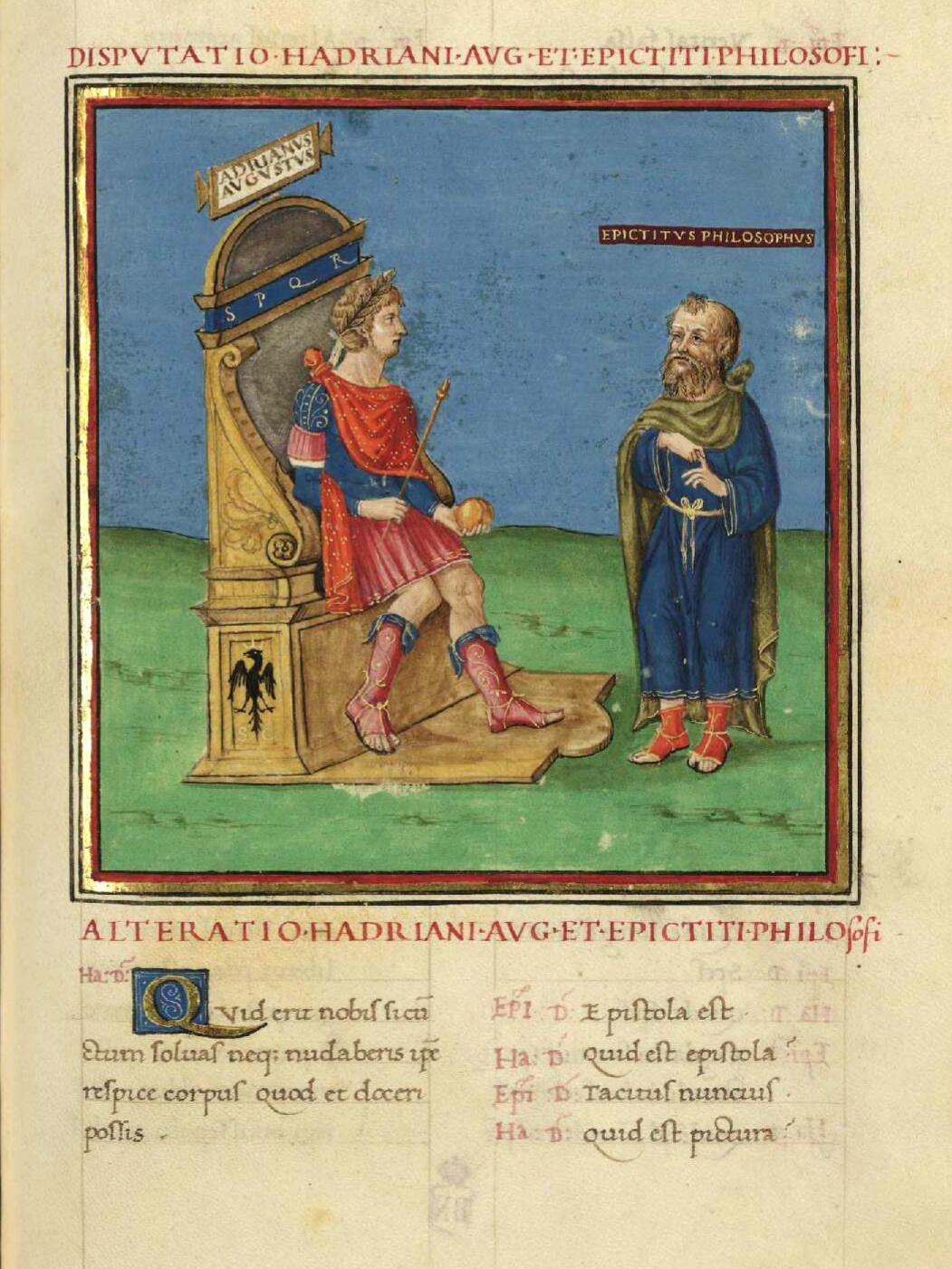
- 15th-century illuminated manuscript, Biblioteca Nacional, Madrid
- Language: Latin
- Genre: Wisdom literature
- Publication date: 2nd or 3rd century
- Publication place: Ancient Rome
- Text: Altercatio Hadriani Augusti et Epicteti philosophi at Wikisource

The Altercatio Hadriani Augusti et Epicteti philosophi is a Latin language question-and-answer dialogue composed by an anonymous author in the 2nd or 3rd century. It consists of a short, fictional conversation between Emperor Hadrian and the Stoic philosopher Epictetus. In its earliest form it consists of seventy-three questions on matters of wisdom and natural phenomena posed by Hadrian and answered by Epictetus. The emphasis throughout is on witty, riddle-like answers rather than philosophical ones.

The work was a popular one throughout the Middle Ages and there were many Christianised adaptations including an Enfant Sage dialogue from France in which the conversation takes place between Hadrian and a three-year-old child called Epitus, and an Ypotis poem from England in which the child is revealed to be Christ.

== Background ==
The Altercatio forms part of a genre of question-and-answer dialogues which makes its appearance between the first and third centuries. Plutarch's Banquet of the Seven Sages contains within it nine written questions supposedly sent to the philosopher Thales by an emissary of the Egyptian pharaoh Amasis II, and another of Plutatch's works, his Table Talks, consists of a series of short dialogues which often begin with a problem posed as a question at the beginning. Another anonymous work of the period is the Contest of Homer and Hesiod in which Homer and Hesiod pose questions on matters of wisdom to each other. Among the works of the Jewish writer Philo of Alexandria are Questions and Answers for problems relating to the books Genesis and Exodus. But the closest literary parallel to the Altercatio is found in the anonymous Life of Secundus which recounts a fictional meeting between Hadrian and the philosopher Secundus the Silent in which Secundus provides written answers to twenty questions submitted by Hadrian.

The appearance of Hadrian in these two texts reflects his reputation as an intellectual with a passing interest in Greek philosophy. Hadrian is reported to have sought out philosophers from the different philosophical schools, he also corresponded with his adopted mother Pompeia Plotina on the succession of the Epicurean school, and a surviving Hebrew Midrashim describes his dealings with the rabbis. The Historia Augusta reports (Hadrian 1.16.10) that Hadrian was an admirer of Epictetus. Epictetus was the most famous Stoic philosopher of the early second century. The writer Arrian had been a pupil of Epictetus at his school in Nicopolis and recorded his lectures in a famous series of Discourses. It is not recorded if or when Hadrian and Epictetus met, but before he became emperor Hadrian had travelled to Greece where he was granted Athenian citizenship and was appointed archon of Athens in 112. The historian Anthony Birley remarks: "it is difficult to avoid the conclusion that the friendship with Epictetus was formed when Hadrian was on his way to Athens for the first time, in about the year 110 or 111."

== Content ==
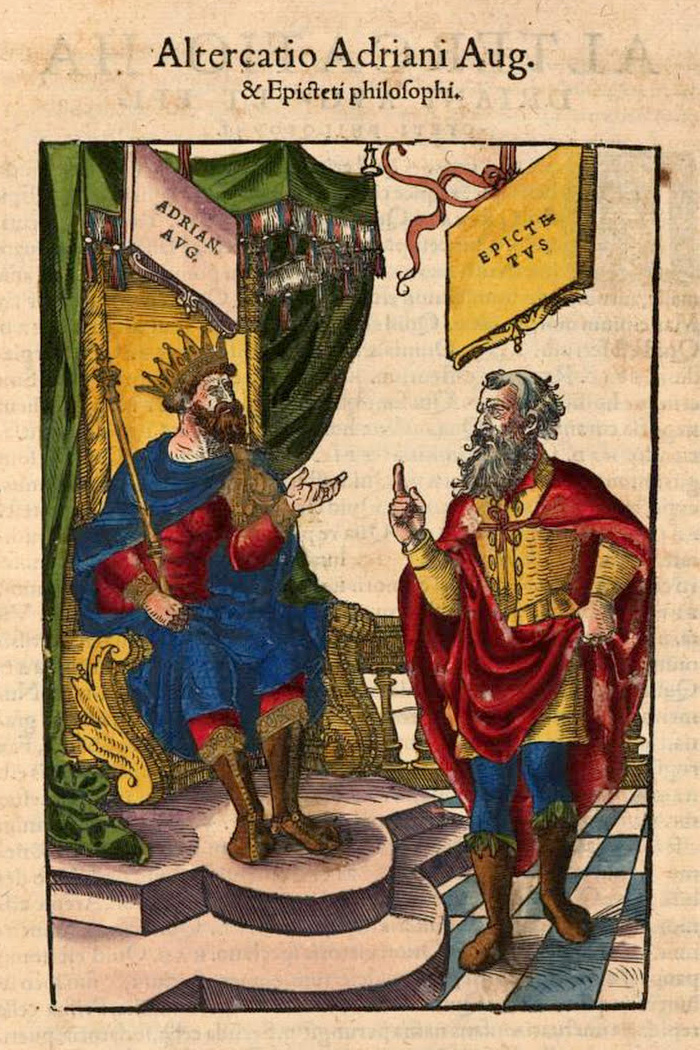
16th century coloured woodcut attributed to Christoffel Schweytzer

The Altercatio is a work of fiction consisting of a series of riddle-like questions proposed by Hadrian and answered by Epictetus. The text is in Latin, and the earliest version is the Altercatio Hadriani Augusti et Epicteti philosophi, which contains seventy-three questions. The work is dated to the second or third century. Subsequently a second version appeared with the title Disputatio Adriani Augusti et Epicteti, but this text consists of only twenty-one questions and answers, almost all of them taken from the Altercatio. At some time in the early medieval period a third variant "Conversation of Adrian and Epictitus" was also composed.

The Altercatio features Hadrian interrogating Epictetus on a wide variety of topics. Throughout the dialogue Epictetus appears as the master or sage providing divine wisdom to Hadrian who acts as the disciple. The questions are very short, and mostly concern themselves with natural phenomena (What is the moon? What is the sun?) and philosophical questions (What is hope? What is fortune?). The answers are intended to be clever and witty. They range from very short responses (Hadrian: "What is death?"—Epictetus: "Perpetual security"), to elaborate metaphors:

Hadrian: What is a human?
Epictetus: A human is like a bath-building. The first room is the warm-water room for anointing oneself: the newborn child is anointed. The second room, the sweating-room, is childhood. The third room, the dry sauna, is youth. The fourth room, the cold-water room, is old age. So the saying is true at all stages.

== Legacy ==
The Altercatio would prove to be a very popular text, with many translations and adaptations. It greatly influenced the development of medieval dialogue, and at an early date it began to merge with Christian doctrine to produce both secular and religious question-and-answer dialogues. In the 8th century Alcuin of York created his own "Pippin and Alcuin" dialogue in imitation of the Altercatio. This dialogue, which Alcuin addressed to Charlemagne's son Pippin, features Pippin in the role as emperor and Alcuin himself taking on the role of the philosopher-sage.

The Altercatio became connected with a list of riddles and questions regarding biblical trivia known as the Joca monachorum or "Monks' Riddles". This latter text produced its own derivative dialogues including Adrian and Ritheus in Old English, and Solomon and Saturn in both Old and Middle English versions.

=== L'Enfant Sage ===
The most famous adaptation was the Enfant Sage written in southern France in the thirteenth century. In this work the conversation takes place between emperor Hadrian and a three-year-old wise child called Epitus, or Apitus. The content of the work has little to do with natural philosophy, instead the questions and answers are mostly religious ones concerning Christian doctrine, morals, and biblical topics. The Enfant Sage was a very popular work, appearing in various forms in forty or fifty manuscript versions during the late Middle Ages, and in many languages ranging from Catalan to Welsh.

=== Ypotis ===
In the fourteenth century an anonymous poet rewrote the Enfant Sage into a Middle English poem called Ypotis. The poem survives in fifteen manuscripts from the 14th and 15th centuries, and Geoffrey Chaucer refers to Ypotis as a well-known "romance" in his Sir Thopas Canterbury Tale. In this poem the conversation takes place between Hadrian and the child 'Ypotis', who is placed on the emperor's knee. The poem ranges over such topics as the fall of man, the five sins that lead to hell, the four forms of saving penance, and the four virtues leading to bliss. At the end of the poem there is a new twist when Ypotis declares that he is Christ, and departs to heaven without further explanation.
