= Menachem Banitt =

Belgian–Israeli scholar

- מנחם בנית
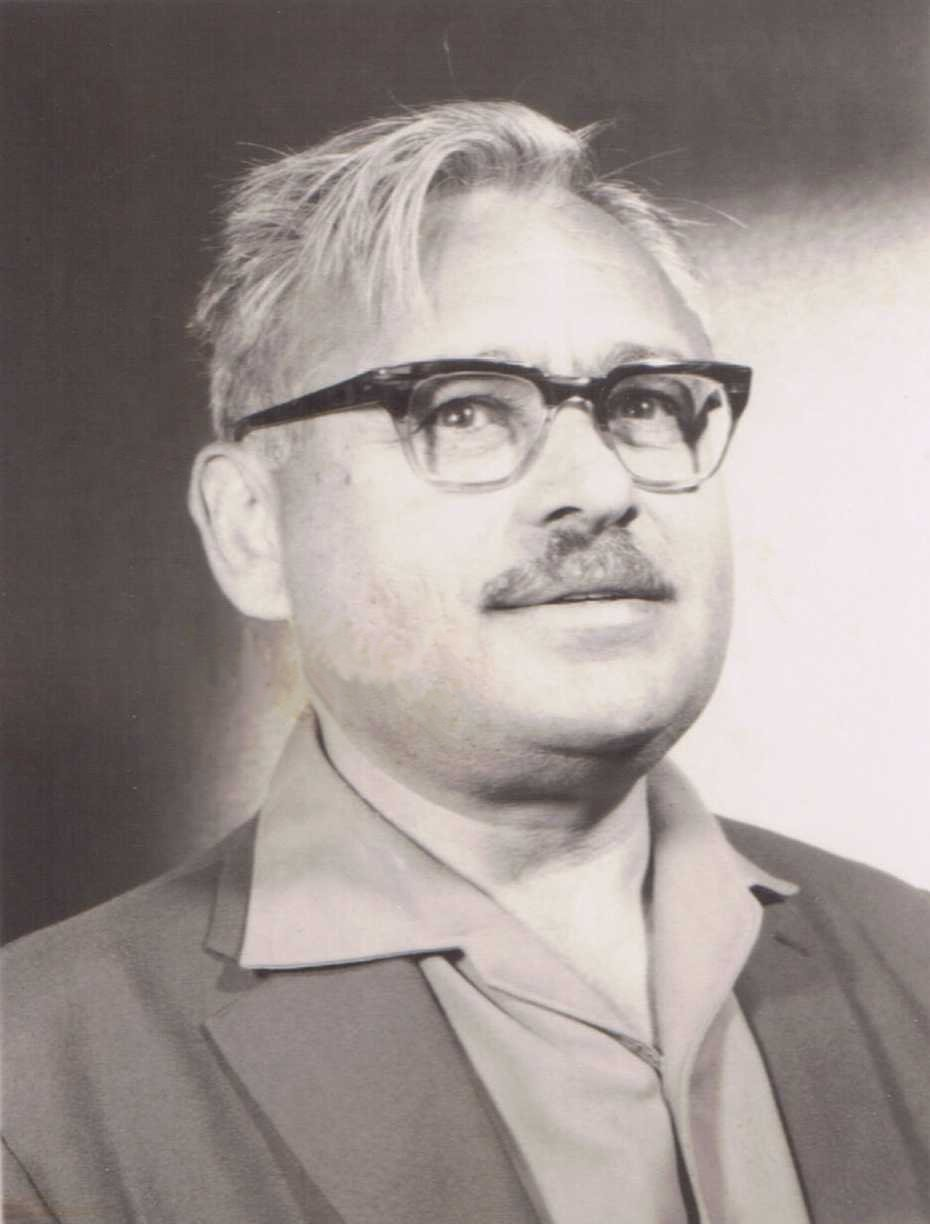
- Menachem Banitt, 1970
- Born: Max Berenblut; 17 July 1914; Antwerp, Belgium
- Died: 24 February 2007 (aged 92); Israel
- Occupations: Scholar of medieval French culture and language
- Known for: Expert on Rashi and Judeo-French
- Awards: Israel Prize (1999); Officier of the Ordre des Palmes académiques

Menachem Banitt (born Max Berenblut, July 17, 1914, Antwerp, Belgium, died February 24, 2007, Israel), was a Belgian–Israeli scholar of medieval French culture and language and an internationally acclaimed expert on Rashi. Banitt was particularly known for his analysis of Rashi's occasional translation of words and phrases from Hebrew or Aramaic into Old French, written phonetically in Hebrew letters.

Banitt, who lived for most of his life in Israel, was a recipient of the Israel Prize for the Study of Jewish Languages in 1999. He was also awarded the French honour of Officier of the Ordre des Palmes académiques.

Banitt was credited with writing the articles in the second edition of The Jewish Encyclopedia (2007) on David S. Blondheim, Judeo-French and La'az.

== See also ==
- List of Israel Prize recipients
