= Judeo-French =

Extinct Jewish Oïl language of France, England, and Germany

Judæo-French
- Zarphatic
- צרפתית Tzarfatit
- Native to: France, western Germany and England
- Ethnicity: Ashkenazi Jews
- Extinct: 14th century
- Language family: Indo-European: Italic; Latino-Faliscan; Latin; Romance; Italo-Western; Western Romance; Gallo-Iberian?; Gallo-Romance; Gallo-Rhaetian?; Arpitan–Oïl; Oïl; Judæo-French
- Early forms: Old Latin: Vulgar Latin; Proto-Romance; Old Gallo-Romance; Old French

Language codes
- ISO 639-3: zrp
- Glottolog: zarp1238

Judeo-French, also called Zarphatic or Western Loez, is a variant of Old French spoken in the Middle Ages by the Jews of northern and eastern France. It was also spoken by French Jews who moved to Norman England. The Jewish communities of the early medieval Rhineland, such as Mainz, Worms and Speyer, may also have been French-speaking before shifting to German, although this is disputed. Judeo-French left lexical traces in Yiddish, but its role in the formation of that language is debated.

Judeo-French was largely identical to Old French, with French Jews adopting the same regional variants as their non-Jewish neighbours. Its main distinguishing features are its use of Hebrew script and an independent literary tradition, with limited Hebrew influence to verbs and vocabulary.

== Name ==
Other names for Judeo-French include Western Loez (Max Weinreich) and Zarphatic (Solomon Birnbaum). The latter comes from the Hebrew name for France, Tzarfat (צרפת), which was originally used in the Hebrew Bible as a name for the city of Sarepta, Phoenicia.

== Classification ==
Unlike most other Jewish languages which had many loan words from Hebrew, Judeo-French had relatively few. While some scholars disagree on whether it constitutes a distinct dialect or language from Old French, the majority view holds that that the two were not significantly different, with French Jews adopting the same regional variants as their non-Jewish neighbours. Its main distinguishing features are its unique writing system, using Hebrew characters, and its independent literary tradition.

Most of the elements from the Hebrew language are found in the function words (articles, prepositions, etc.), though there are some changes to verbs and vocabulary. According to Marc Kiwitt, "the major part of linguistic data attested in Judeo-French sources is simply common Old French written in Hebrew script, with some texts showing little to no register variation in comparison with Christian Old French sources", due to their degree of social integration within the Christian majority until the end of the 13th century.

== History and use ==
Judeo-French textual production developed in three successive stages: isolated Old French glosses within Hebrew texts (Bible and Talmud commentaries, prayer books) from the second half of the 11th century; Hebrew-French biblical glossaries of several thousand words each, from the early 13th to the early 14th century; and texts written entirely in French, attested from the second half of the 13th century to around 1300.

=== Development ===
The language first appeared in this form in the 11th century in glosses of the Torah and Talmud written by the rabbis Moshe HaDarshan and Rashi, and became secularised by the 13th century, when it was used in varied domains such as poetry, wedding songs, medical treatises, and astronomy.

Judeo-French texts were concentrated in Northern and Eastern France, particularly in the communities of Champagne (centred on Troyes), Normandy (Rouen), and Lorraine, which maintained close cultural ties with the Rhenish communities of Speyer, Worms, and Mainz. Texts were also produced in Norman England, whose Jewish communities remained linked to those of Normandy until the expulsion of 1290.

=== Extinction ===
The Judeo-French language disappeared from the Kingdom of France following the two waves of expulsion of Jews in 1306 and 1394, which effectively ended the Jewish presence in Northern France. From the beginning of this declining period in the 14th century, surviving texts originate exclusively from Eastern France (Alsace, Lorraine, and the Free County of Burgundy), which were not affected by the expulsion of 1306. It has been estimated that between 95% and 98% of the texts produced in France by Jews has disappeared and been destroyed in the course of time.

After the expulsions, French Jews carried Judeo-French with them to Germany, Hungary, and Italy, though their language progressively diverged from its medieval form and eventually went extinct. Some manuscripts produced in Italy and Germany during the late 14th and even 15th centuries contain Judeo-French texts, the latest known being a charoset recipe from a 1470 prayer book. According to Kiwitt, it remains uncertain whether these reflect a living language community or simply the scribal copying of earlier, now lost, models.

== Influence on Yiddish ==
The role of Judeo-French in the formation of Yiddish is controversial. Max Weinreich held that Yiddish arose around the year 1000 in the Rhineland, when speakers of Judeo-French ('Western Loez') and Judeo-Italian ('Southern Loez') adopted the German speech of their surroundings while retaining a residue of Romance vocabulary; other linguists, such as Dovid Katz and Paul Wexler, deny any Judeo-French substratum and treat the Romance words of Yiddish as later borrowings.

For Alexander Beider, part of the ancestors of Rhineland Jews did come from Old French-speaking territory: about a fifth of the Jewish women of the Rhineland recorded in 1096 bore names of Romance origin, the traditional Jewish names of Worms and of the Rhine show specifically Old French sound developments, and the phonology of the oldest Romance words indicates that this substratum ceased to follow the evolution of French in the 8th and 9th centuries. According to Menachem Banitt, Judeo-French appears to have been the vernacular of Rhineland Jewish communities in the early Middle Ages, since it left traces in Yiddish vocabulary, and in the Gallicised names Jews used for their own communities, such as Aspire (Speyer), Germèse (Worms), and Magence (Mainz).

Yiddish words commonly traced to Old French or Judeo-French include tsholnt (cholent, from chalent, 'warm'), the Western Yiddish verb oren ('to pray', from orer) and teytl ('date', reflecting the specifically Jewish form daytel), alongside later loanwords brought by continuing contacts with French Jewry and by refugees from the 14th-century expulsions. Cyril Aslanov, however, reassigns several items of Weinreich's list to Italo-Romance dialects, leaving to Old French only words such as tsholnt, teytl and oren. Beider further argues that the influence remained purely lexical, the plural suffix -s, once derived from French, being better explained through German dialectal or Hebrew models, a point on which Aslanov concurs.

== Writing system ==
Judeo-French was written using the Hebrew writing system and the Tiberian system for diacritical markers and reflected some Latin writing traditions that help to distinguish it from a solely phonetic reproduction of spoken language.

Not all Hebrew graphemes are used in Judeo-French: the graphemes kaph (כ), samekh (ס), and tav (ת), are rare, and ḥet (ח) and ʕayin (ע) are omitted entirely.

Sample text
Language	Example text
Old French (Hebrew script)	קוֹזָא קִיאֵייט אַקוֹטֶוּמֵייאָה זֵייט אַטְרָא טוֹאוּטְ אוֹטְרִייֵאָה
Transliteration	q̄ōzə qīyēyṭ aqōṭūmēyəh dēyṭ aṭre ṭōūṭ ōṭryēəh
Old French (Latin script)	Chose qui eit acotumeie, deit etre tout otreieie
English translation	Something that is customary must be granted freely
French translation	Ce qui est coutumier doit être accordé librement

== See also ==
- Judeo-Romance languages
  - Judeo-Latin
  - Judeo-Spanish (Ladino)
- History of the Jews in France
