= Aristocreon =

Chrysippus' nephew

Aristocreon (Ancient Greek: Ἀριστοκρέων; fl. 200 BC) was a Stoic philosopher and the nephew of Chrysippus.

== Biography ==
Aristocreon was a son of the sister of Chrysippus, and became his pupil. Chrysippus dedicated several of his works to him. A recovered Stoic work, on a papyrus from Herculaneum mentions him.PHerc. 1667 Of the few facts known about Aristocreon's life, it is known that between 229 and 190 BC, he was in Athens, where he obtained the official position of a Proxenos (a consular agent acting for another city). He was still alive in Athens in 184 BC. Plutarch records that Aristocreon erected a bronze statue of his uncle on a pillar and engraved a verse to him:

Of uncle Chrysippus Aristocreon this likeness erected;
The knots the Academy tied, the cleaver, Chrysippus, dissected.

It is not known whether this Aristocreon is the same as the author of a description of Egypt.
