= Destiny =

Predetermined course of events

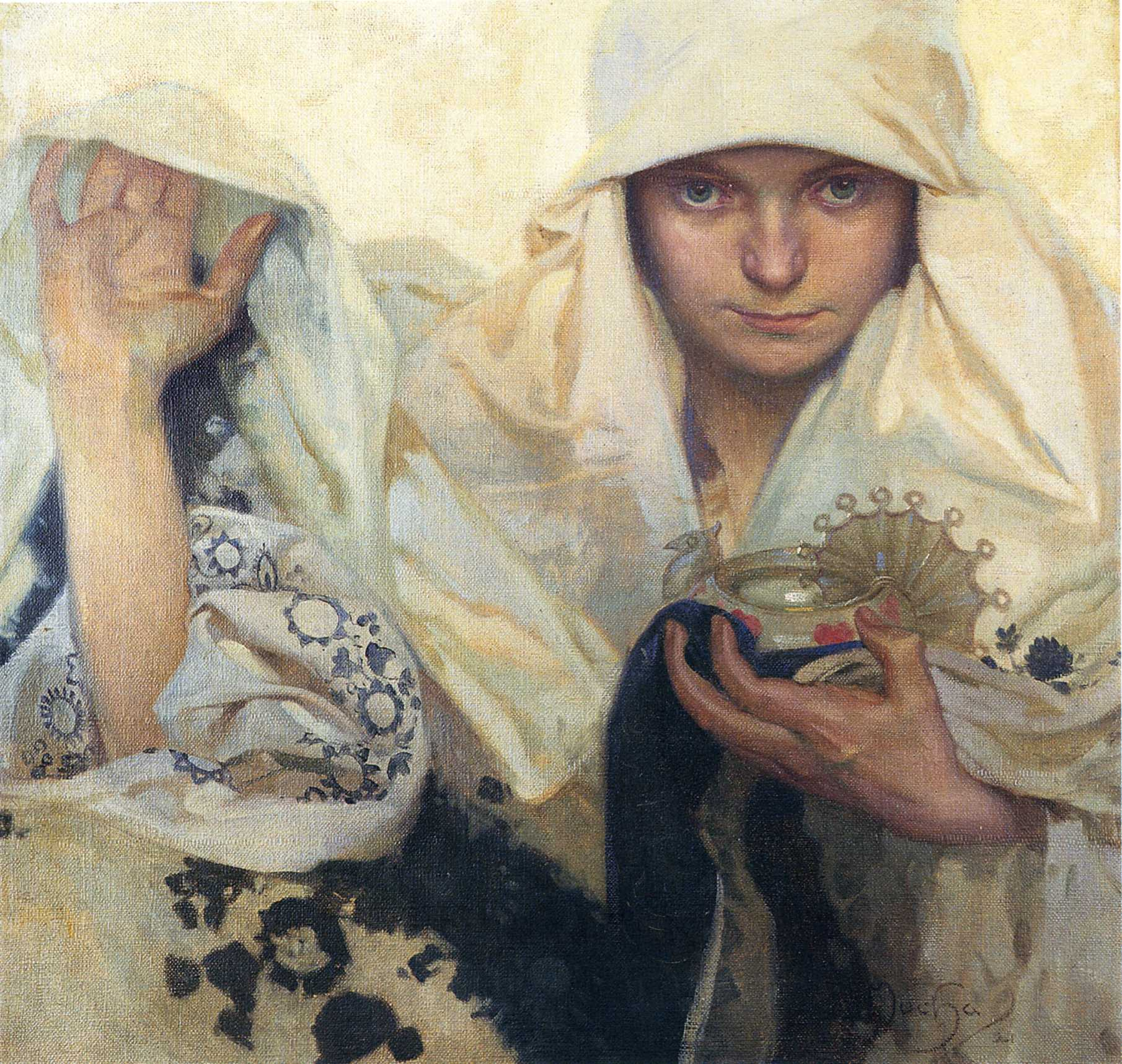
Fate, by Alphonse Mucha

Destiny, sometimes also called fate (from Latin fatum 'decree, prediction, destiny, fate'), is a predetermined course of events.

Destiny can be compared with determinism, the philosophical proposition that every event, including human cognition and behavior, is causally determined by an unbroken chain of prior occurrences.

== Fate ==
The earliest known mention of the term or its meaning is found on a document written in cuneiform script that reports on the mythical Tablet of Destinies. It probably refers to a political treaty between three groups of Sumerian gods (cf. the Epic Athra Hasis), whereby only the leader has the power to restore the things he once determined to their original state.

- Traditional usage defines fate as a power or agency that predetermines and orders the course of events. Fate defines events as ordered or "inevitable" and unavoidable. This is a concept based on the belief that there is a fixed natural order to the universe, and in some conceptions, the cosmos.
- Classical and European mythology feature personified "fate spinners," known as the Moirai in Greek mythology, the Parcae in Roman mythology, and the Norns in Norse mythology. They determine the events of the world through the mystic spinning of threads that represent individual human fates.
- Fate is the future scenario, which cannot be determined by decisions an individual will make. However, Destiny is about the present, where every decision an individual has made has led them to their present scenario.
- Fatalism refers to the belief that events fixed by fate are unchangeable by any type of human agency. In other words, humans cannot alter their own fates or the fates of others.

== Fortune ==
Distinguished from fate and destiny, fortune can refer to chance, or luck, as in fortunate, or to an event or set of events positively or negatively affecting someone or a group, or in an idiom, to tell someone's fortune, or simply the result of chance and events. In Hellenistic civilization, the chaotic and unforeseeable turns of chance gave increasing prominence to a previously less notable goddess, Tyche (literally "Luck"), who embodied the good fortune of a city and all whose lives depended on its security and prosperity, two good qualities of life that appeared to be out of human reach. The Roman image of Fortuna, with the wheel she blindly turned, was retained by Christian writers including Boethius, revived strongly in the Renaissance, and survives in some forms today.

== Western philosophy ==
=== Ancient Greek philosophy ===
The Stoics believed that human decisions and actions ultimately went according to a divine plan devised by a god. They claimed that although humans theoretically have free will, their souls and the circumstances under which they live are all part of the universal network of fate.

The Epicureans challenged the Stoic beliefs by denying the existence of this divine fate. They believed that a human's actions were voluntary so long as they were rational.

=== Modern philosophy ===
In common usage, destiny and fate are synonymous, but with regard to 19th-century philosophy, the words gained inherently different meanings.

For Arthur Schopenhauer, destiny was just a manifestation of the Will to Live, which can be at the same time living fate and choice of overrunning fate, by means of the Art, of the Morality and of the Ascesis.

For Friedrich Nietzsche, destiny keeps the form of Amor fati (Love of Fate) through the important element of Nietzsche's philosophy, the "will to power" (der Wille zur Macht), the basis of human behavior, influenced by the Will to Live of Schopenhauer. But this concept may have even other senses, although he, in various places, saw the will to power as a strong element for adaptation or survival in a better way. Nietzsche eventually transformed the idea of matter as centers of force into matter as centers of will to power as humanity's destiny to face with amor fati. The expression Amor fati is used repeatedly by Nietzsche as acceptation-choice of the fate, but in such way it becomes even another thing, precisely a "choice" destiny.

Determinism is a philosophical concept often confused with fate. It can be defined as the notion that all intents/actions are causally determined by the culminations of an agent's existing circumstances; simply put, everything that happens is determined by things that have already happened. Determinism differs from fate in that it is never conceived as being a spiritual, religious, nor astrological notion; fate is typically thought of as being "given" or "decreed" while determinism is "caused". Influential philosophers like Robert Kane, Thomas Nagel, Roderick Chisholm, and A. J. Ayer have written about this notion.

== Eastern Philosophy ==
Ming yun (Chinese: 命運) is a concept of the personal life and destiny in the Chinese folk religion. Ming means 'life', 'right', or 'destiny', and yun means 'circumstance' or 'individual choice'. Mìng is given and influenced by Tian 'heaven', akin to the Mandate of Heaven of monarchs as identified by Mencius. Ming yun is thus perceived as being both fixed, flexible, and open-ended.

== Psychology ==
Among the representatives of depth psychology school, the greatest contribution to the study of the notion such as "fate" was made by Carl Gustav Jung, Sigmund Freud and Leopold Szondi.

== Religion ==
The concept of destiny, fate or causation is prominent in most religions – but takes different forms:

- The ancient Sumerians spoke of divine predetermination of the individual's destiny
- In Babylonian religion, the god Nabu, as the god of writing, inscribed the fates assigned to humans by the gods of the Assyro-Babylonian pantheon which included the Anunnaki who would decree the fates of humanity
- Followers of Ancient Greek religion regarded not only the Moirai but also the gods, particularly Zeus, as responsible for deciding and carrying out destiny, respectively.
- Some Christians believe that humans all have free will, while others believe in predestination.
- In Islam, fate or qadar is the decree of God.
- Within Buddhism, all phenomena (mind or otherwise) are taught as dependently arisen from previous phenomena according to universal law – a concept known as paṭiccasamuppāda. This core teaching is shared across all schools of thought, and directly informs other core concepts such as impermanence and non-self (also common to all schools of Buddhism).

== Politics ==
Metaphorical expressions of a predetermined destiny are commonly used by politicians to describe events not understood. Otto Von Bismarck said that the best a politician can do is to 'listen for God's footsteps and hang on to His coat tails'.

General José de San Martín, Libertador of Argentina, Chile and Peru, famously said "You will be what you must be, or you will be nothing".

In War and Peace, Leo Tolstoy wrote of the 'unconscious swarm-life of mankind', while Shakespeare spoke of a 'tide in the affairs of men' in his play Julius Caesar.

== Literature ==
In ancient Greece, many legends and tales teach the futility of trying to outmaneuver an inexorable fate that has been correctly predicted. This portrayal of fate is present in works such as Oedipus Rex (427 BCE), the Iliad, the Odyssey (800 BCE), and Theogony. Many ancient Chinese works have also portrayed the concept of fate, most notably the Liezi, Mengzi, and the Zhuangzi. Similarly, and in Italy, the Spanish Duque de Rivas' play that Verdi transformed into La Forza del Destino ("The Force of Destiny") includes notions of fate.

In England, fate has played a notable literary role in Shakespeare's Macbeth (1606), Thomas Hardy's Tess of the d'Urbervilles (1891), Samuel Beckett's Endgame (1957), and W.W Jacobs' popular short story "The Monkey's Paw" (1902). In America, Thornton Wilder's book The Bridge of San Luis Rey (1927) portrays the conception of fate.

In Germany, fate is a recurring theme in the literature of Hermann Hesse (1877–1962), including Siddharta (1922) and his magnum opus, Das Glasperlenspiel, also published as The Glass Bead Game (1943). And by Hollywood through such characters as Neo in The Matrix. The common theme of these works involves a protagonist who cannot escape their destiny, however hard they try. In Neil Gaiman's graphic novel series The Sandman, destiny is one of the Endless, depicted as a blind man carrying a book that contains all the past and all the future: "Destiny is the oldest of the Endless; in the Beginning was the Word, and it was traced by hand on the first page of his book, before ever it was spoken aloud."

Destiny is a frequent concept in Jorge Luis Borges' short stories and poems. In The Garden of Forking Paths, destiny is represented by a labyrinth of choices, where every possibility exists simultaneously. The protagonist later realizes his actions are predetermined as the story unfolds with an inevitable conclusion. In The Lottery in Babylon, as a metaphor for fate and chance, a secret lottery determines every aspect of life, making personal choice irrelevant. In Ajedrez, Chess pieces move accordingly to fixed rules, symbolizing how humans follow a predetermined destiny controlled by an unseen hand.

Many stories and poems by Borges also develop the idea of a destined death. In Poema conjetural, an important historical figure in the history of Argentina, who had dreamed of having a civilized and prestigious life and death, ends up being violently tracked down by "savages" and killed, but instead of lamenting his death, he dies surprisingly joyfully "finding his south american destiny".

Similarly, in The South, a dying man in a hospital hallucinates about having a heroic death, in which he is killed in a duel against a gaucho.

== See also ==
- Ājīvika
- Causality
- Divine providence
- Geas
- Karma
- Lazy argument
- Omniscience
- Oracle
- Predestination in Islam
- Prophecy
- Psychology of human destiny
- Russian avos'
- Synchronicity
- Wyrd
- Yuanfen
