= Secundus the Silent =

2nd-century Athenian philosopher

Secundus the Silent (Ancient Greek: Σεκοῦνδος) (fl. 2nd century AD) was a philosopher who lived in Athens in the early 2nd century, who had taken a vow of silence. An anonymous text entitled Life of Secundus (Latin: Vita Secundi Philosophi) purports to give details of his life as well as answers to philosophical questions posed to him by the emperor Hadrian. The work enjoyed great popularity in the Middle Ages.

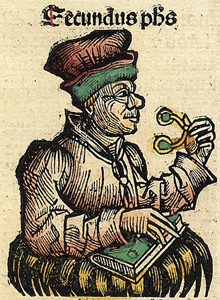
Secundus depicted in the Nuremberg Chronicle.

== Life ==
Secundus is known only from an anonymous Life of Secundus which has survived. We are told that he was sent away from home to be educated when he was a small boy. When he was an adult he decided to test the proposition that every woman is a whore. So he returned home dressed like a Cynic philosopher with long hair and a beard, and, unrecognisable to his own mother, he persuaded her to agree to sleep with him for fifty gold pieces. After he had spent the night with her, doing nothing more than sleeping chastely in her bed, he told her who he was. Shamed, his mother hanged herself, and Secundus, blaming his own tongue for the trouble he caused, committed himself to a lifelong vow of silence, similar to a Pythagorean philosopher.

Having heard about this silent philosopher, Hadrian summoned him and threatened to execute him if he did not speak. Secundus refused to speak, and Hadrian, impressed by this resolve, relented. Secundus did, however, agree to answer twenty questions by writing the answers on a tablet.

These questions and answers are given in the anonymous text; short answers are given to questions such as "What is the Universe?", "What is God?", and "What is Beauty?". A typical response is the answer to question 17: What is Poverty?

A good thing that is hated, the mother of health, a hindrance to pleasures, a way of life free of worry, a possession hard to cast off, the teacher of inventions, the finder of wisdom, a business that nobody envies, property unassessed, merchandise not subject to tariff, profit not to be reckoned in terms of cash, a possession not interfered with by informers, non-evident good fortune, good fortune free of care.

How much of the story of Secundus's life is accurate is impossible to say. The questions and answers are just one example of several such compositions which survive, including a similar question and answer conversation between Hadrian and Epictetus.

There was a Rhetorician of the same period called Secundus of Athens, mentioned by Philostratus. Whether he could be the same person as this Secundus is unknown.

== Reception ==
A garbled Judeo-Latin quotation of Secundus used as a magic incantation. From the Cairo Geniza. It is Secundus' definition of God: "An intelligible unknown, a unique being who has no equal, something sought but not comprehended".

The oldest evidence for the existence of the Greek biography is a papyrus fragment from the 3rd Century. The complete text is only found in a single manuscript from the 11th Century, the other Greek manuscripts contain only the questions and answers. Willelmus Medicus, later a monk at the Abbey of Saint-Denis, brought the complete manuscript from Constantinople to France in 1167. He made a Latin translation (Vita Secundi Philosophi), which became popular, as numerous copies show. An abridged version of this translation was placed by Vincent of Beauvais into his popular encyclopedia Speculum Historiale in the 13th century.

In the early 14th Century, the Liber de Vita et Moribus Philosophorum, which was a popular biographical presentation of ancient non-Christian spiritual life, dedicated a chapter to Secundus. He was so well known that his bust with a quote (the response to the question "What is God?") was carved in the Gothic choir stalls of Ulm Minster. The popularity of the material in the Middle Ages was connected, among other things, with the fact that Secundus's readiness to die reminded readers at that time of the attitude of Christian martyrs.

Late medieval translations of the Latin text of the biography include: two German, two Spanish, six French, an Icelandic, and four Italian versions. Some translations are very free, as partial elements of larger works. The popularity of the work in the Middle Ages, is also testified by translations in other languages: Syriac, Armenian, Arabic, and Ethiopic.
