= Karsten Friis Johansen =

Danish philosopher and classical philologist

- Born: 5 December 1930
- Died: 29 July 2010 (aged 79)
- Occupations: Philosopher, classical philologist
- Relatives: Holger Friis Johansen (brother)

Philosophical work
- Institutions: Royal Library, Denmark; University of Copenhagen
- Main interests: Ancient philosophy, medieval philosophy, Plato
- Notable works: Studier over Platons Parmenides

Karsten Friis Johansen (5 December 1930 – 29 July 2010) was a Danish philosopher and classical philologist.

He was a brother of Holger Friis Johansen. He was a librarian at the Royal Library, Denmark from 1957 to 1968, took the dr.phil. degree with the thesis Studier over Platons Parmenides in 1964 and was a professor of antique and medieval philosophy at the University of Copenhagen from 1969 to 1998. He was a fellow of the Royal Danish Academy of Sciences and Letters, Norwegian Academy of Science and Letters and the Society for Danish Language and Literature. He also chaired Platonselskabet and Den Arnamagnæanske Stiftelse and was the secretary of Selskabet til Historisk Kildeskrifters Oversættelser.
