= Joseph ben Nathan Official =

Joseph ben Nathan Official was a French-Jewish controversialist. He lived, probably at Sens, in the thirteenth century. He was a descendant of Kalonymus ben Todros, the nasi of Narbonne. His father held a public office to which Joseph probably succeeded, whence the surname "Official."

== Controversies with officials ==
Coming in contact with high officials and ecclesiastical dignitaries, Joseph, like his father, was often invited to take part in religious controversies, in which he acquired great skill. Accounts of these controversies, together with those of his father and of some French rabbis, were collected by Joseph in a work entitled Yosef ha-Meqanne or Teshubot ha-Minim, which is still extant in manuscript (Paris, Bibliothèque Nationale, Hebr. MS. No. 712; Steinschneider, Cat. Hamburg Hebr. MSS. No. 187, 7). The Christian personages who figure in the discussions are: Pope Gregory (probably Gregory X); the bishops of Sens, Mans, Meaux, Vannes, Anjou, Poitiers, Angoulême, and St. Malo; the bishop of the king (St. Louis); the confessor of the queen (probably Guillaume of Auvergne); the chancellor; friars of the Cordelier and Jacobite orders; and some Jewish converts. All the Christian dogmas which are derived from scriptural texts, such as the immaculate conception, the divinity of Jesus, his mission on earth, his birth, death, and resurrection, are analyzed and discussed; and there occur refutations of some attacks on Judaism, such as the accusation of ritual murder, which the chancellor endeavored to base upon Num. xxiii. 24.

The characteristic feature of these controversies, which in the main have no claim to great originality as regards the arguments used, is the freedom of speech and boldness displayed by the Jewish participants, who do not content themselves with standing upon the defensive, but very often attack their opponents not with dialectics, but with clever repartee. Of this kind of controversy the following may serve as examples:

== Examples ==
Nathan ben Meshullam was asked to give a reason for the duration of the present exile, while that of Babylon, which was inflicted upon the Jews as a punishment for the worst of crimes, idolatry, lasted only seventy years. He answered: "Because in the time of the First Temple the Jews used to make stone images of Astarte and statues which had no chance of duration, while in the time of the Second Temple they deified one of themselves, Jesus, to whom they applied the holy prophecies, and thus created a durable idol which attracted many worshipers. The gravity of the fault, therefore, occasioned equal severity in the punishment."

Nathan was also asked why the usual expression "And God saw that it was good" is lacking in the account of the second day of the Creation, to which he replied: "Because among the things done on that day was the division of the waters, which God had foreseen would be used for idolatrous purposes [baptism]."

Elijah, Joseph ben Nathan's brother, was asked by the chancellor why the Mosaic law declared contact with, or being in the presence or neighborhood of, a dead body to be a cause of impurity. "Because," answered he, "God foresaw that a time would come when a nation would pretend that He had voluntarily submitted Himself to death; therefore He showed Himself so severe against the impurities of death."

Joseph's compilation furnishes much valuable information concerning the condition of the French Jews in the twelfth and thirteenth centuries. The numerous accusations brought against them by the Christian population, such as ritual murder and the crucifixion of Jesus, found an echo in the discussions. According to the Jewish Encyclopedia, "In an explanation of a text may very often be detected an expression of the anguish of the persecuted."

== Influence ==
Although the Yosef ha-Meqanne is nowhere expressly quoted, it may be assumed that it was used by the polemicists. The Nitztzachon Yashan, published by Wagenseil, and the Nitztzachon of Lipmann of Mülhausen have some analogical passages. A great number of the answers of Joseph are reproduced almost verbatim in many Bible commentaries of French origin. Specimens of such commentaries, in which many passages can thus be traced, were published by Berliner in his Peletat Soferim and by Neubauer in Geiger's Zeitschrift (1871).

Joseph seems to have been the author also of a commentary on the Pentateuch, and of the Hebrew version of the controversy of Jehiel of Paris, at the end of which is a short poem containing his initials.
