= John M. Rist =

British scholar

John Michael Rist FRSC (born 1936) is a British scholar of ancient philosophy, classics, and early Christian philosophy and theology, known mainly for his contributions to the history of metaphysics and ethics. He is the author of monographs on Plato, Aristotle, the Stoics, Epicurus, Plotinus, the dating of the Gospels, and Augustine. Rist is Professor of Classics Emeritus at the University of Toronto and part-time Visiting Professor at the Institutum Patristicum Augustinianum in Rome, held the Father Kurt Pritzl, O.P., Chair in Philosophy at the Catholic University of America in Washington, D.C. (from 2011 to 2017), and is a life member of Clare Hall, Cambridge University. During his lengthy academic career he has been Regius Professor of Classics at the University of Aberdeen (1980-1983), Professor of Classics and Philosophy at the University of Toronto (1983–1996), and the Lady Davis Visiting Professor in Philosophy at the Hebrew University of Jerusalem (1995).

His work focuses in the fields of ancient philosophy and historical theology.

== Major works ==
Books:

- Eros and Psyche: Studies in Plato, Plotinus and Origen. (Toronto : University of Toronto Press, 1964); Italian edition (Milan: Vita e Pensiero, 1995).
- Plotinus: The Road to Reality (Cambridge University Press, 1967); Italian edition with new introduction (Genoa: Melangolo, 1995).
- Stoic Philosophy (Cambridge University Press, 1969); Spanish translation with new introduction (Barcelona: Critica, 1995) 1995.
- Epicurus: An Introduction (Cambridge University Press, 1972) pp. xiv, 185; Italian edition (Mursia, 1978); Catalan translation (Santa Coloma de Queralt, 2008).
- The Stoics (ed.) (University of California Press, 1978).
- On the Independence of Matthew and Mark (Cambridge University Press, N.T.S. Monograph Series 32, 1978).
- Human Value: A Study of Ancient Philosophical Ethics (Philosophia Antiqua 40) (Brill: Leiden, 1982).
- Platonism and Its Christian Heritage (Ashgate Variorum: London, 1985).
- The Mind of Aristotle (University of Toronto Press, 1989).
- Augustine: Ancient Thought Baptized (Cambridge University Press, 1994). Italian edition (Milan: Vita e Pensiero, 1997); Spanish (Ediciones Destino) edition planned.
- Man, Soul and Body: Essays in Ancient Thought from Plato to Dionysius (Ashgate Variorum: London, 1996).
- On Inoculating Moral Philosophy against God (Marquette University Press, 2000).
- Real Ethics: Rethinking the Foundations of Morality (Cambridge University Press, 2001).
- What is Truth? From the Academy to the Vatican (Cambridge University Press, 2008) pp. xiv, 361.
- Plato’s Moral Realism. The Discovery of the Presuppositions of Ethics (The Catholic University of America Press, 2012).
- Augustine Deformed: Love, Sin, and Freedom in the Western Moral Tradition (Cambridge University Press, 2014).
- On Ethics, Politics and Psychology in the Twenty-First Century (Reading Augustine) (Bloomsbury, 2017).
- What is a Person?: Realities, Constructs, Illusions (Cambridge University Press, 2020).
- (with Anna Rist) Confusion in the West: Retrieving Tradition in the Modern and Post-Modern World (Cambridge University Press, 2023).

== Philosophical and religious views ==
Rist has argued that the most coherent and sound form of ethical realism is what he calls 'transcendental realism,' that is, realism grounded in transcendent standards for morality, and thus in a metaphysics of morals that is in some sense 'Platonic.' Unlike Iris Murdoch's slightly earlier work proposing Platonic metaphysics as a guide to morals, with which it shares some sympathies, Rist's project has been to show that in order for an ethics to be realist, it must be theistic, that is, grounded in a divine principle that is metaphysically real.

Rist is a convert to Catholicism from agnosticism. As he explained in a 1997 article, after studying Plato and Plotinus he became convinced that the notion of an intrinsically evil act requires an unchanging standard for morality (cf. the Platonic Form of Justice), and that this transcendent standard must exist in a divine mind (cf. Plotinus' second divine hypostasis, νοῦς). Subsequently, he became convinced that a divine mind that was absolutely good would intervene in human history out of concern for individual human beings; he thus began to move beyond neo-Platonism and become interested in Christianity. A study of the Gospels of Matthew and Mark convinced him that the compilation of Matthew was to be dated before 70 A.D./C.E., and so he became convinced that "the full range of Christian beliefs must go back to the very earliest followers of Jesus, and in all probability to Jesus himself. The solution that either Jesus was a lunatic or his earliest followers were all blatant liars again seemed the only alternative possibility if their claims were false.... I had to decide only whether the totality of Jesus' recorded behavior looked like that of a madman; it was not difficult to see that it did not." By further research into Patristics, and through reading John Henry Newman, he became convinced that the present-day Catholic Church is in continuity with that of the apostles.

Like other Catholic intellectuals of the same generation—e.g. Alasdair MacIntyre, Charles Taylor, and Rémi Brague—Rist has turned in his later career increasingly to the relationship of Catholic thought and culture to history and public policy.

In April 2019, Rist was among 19 signatories of a letter to the bishops of the world, accusing Pope Francis of heresy.
