= Judeo-Latin =

Language

An example of Judeo-Latin magical text from the Cairo Geniza. It is a quotation attributed to the 2nd-century philosopher Secundus the Silent when asked who God was: "An intelligible unknown, a unique being who has no equal, something sought but not comprehended".

Judeo-Latin (also spelled Judaeo-Latin) is the use by Jews of the Hebrew alphabet to write Latin. The term was coined by Cecil Roth to describe a small corpus of texts from the Middle Ages. In the Middle Ages, there was no Judeo-Latin in the sense of "an ethnodialect used by Jews on a regular basis to communicate among themselves", and the existence of such a Jewish language under the Roman Empire is pure conjecture.

The Judeo-Latin corpus includes an Anglo-Jewish charter and Latin quotations in otherwise Hebrew works (such as anti-Christian polemics, incantations and prayers). Christian converts to Judaism sometimes brought with them an extensive knowledge of the Vulgate translation of the Bible. The Sefer Nizzahon Yashan and Joseph ben Nathan Official's Sefer Yosef ha-Mekanne contain extensive quotations from the Vulgate in Hebrew letters. Latin technical terms sometimes appear in Hebrew texts. There is evidence of the oral use of Latin formulas in dowsing, ordeals and ceremonies.

Leo Levi found some Hebraisms in a few epigraphs in Italy.
