= Lazy argument =

Philosophical view

The lazy argument or idle argument (Ancient Greek: ἀργὸς λόγος) is an attempt to undermine the philosophical doctrine of fatalism by demonstrating that, if everything that happens is determined by fate, it is futile to take any kind of action. Its basic form is that of a complex constructive dilemma.

== History ==
The general idea behind the lazy argument can already be found in Aristotle's De Interpretatione, chapter 9. The earliest surviving text that provides the argument in full is Cicero's On Fate 28–9. It is also presented in Origen, Against Celsus II.20, and mentioned in Pseudo-Plutarch, On Fate 574e. Seneca's Natural Questions II.38.3 provides evidence for a similar argument.

== Argument ==
The argument is stated by Origen as follows:

If it is fated that you will recover from this illness, then, regardless of whether you consult a doctor or you do not consult [a doctor] you will recover. But also: if it is fated that you won't recover from this illness, then, regardless of whether you consult a doctor or you do not consult [a doctor] you won't recover. But either it is fated that you will recover from this illness or it is fated that you won't recover. Therefore it is futile to consult a doctor.

The argument has force only for those who accept that what happens to people is determined by fate.

== Refutation ==
The Stoic philosopher Chrysippus' refutation of the lazy argument is given in Cicero's On Fate and in Eusebius' Preparation for the Gospel. The argument, as presented by Cicero, calls upon the idea that an event is "co-fated" with other events. As in the example above, if it is fated for someone to recover from an illness, then the necessary steps towards recovery are also fated, and can be said to be co-fated along with this final event; so whilst recovery will occur, the steps towards recovery must also occur and evidently will occur if one is truly fated to recover.

The same argument is presented by Eusebius as follows:

The non-destruction of one's coat, he [Chrysippus] says, is not fated simply, but co-fated with its being taken care of, and someone's being saved from his enemies is co-fated with his fleeing those enemies; and having children is co-fated with being willing to lie with a woman. ... For many things cannot occur without our being willing and indeed contributing a most strenuous eagerness and zeal for these things, since, he says, it was fated for these things to occur in conjunction with this personal effort. ... But it will be in our power, he says, with what is in our power being included in fate.

The lazy argument has also been attacked by G. W. Leibniz, who referred to it as la raison paresseuse ('the lazy reason'). In his 1710 work Theodicy, Leibniz writes:

Men have been perplexed in well-nigh every age by a sophism which the ancients called the 'Lazy Reason', because it tended towards doing nothing, or at least towards being careful for nothing and only following inclination for the pleasure of the moment. For, they said, if the future is necessary, that which must happen will happen, whatever I may do ... But it is taking an unfair advantage of this alleged necessity of fate to employ it in excuse for our vices and our libertinism ... It is untrue that the event happens whatever one may do: it will happen because one does what leads thereto; and if the event is written beforehand, the cause that will make it happen is written also. Thus the connexion of effects and causes, so far from establishing the doctrine of a necessity detrimental to conduct, serves to overthrow it.
