= Epictetus =

Greek Stoic philosopher (c. 50 – c. 135)

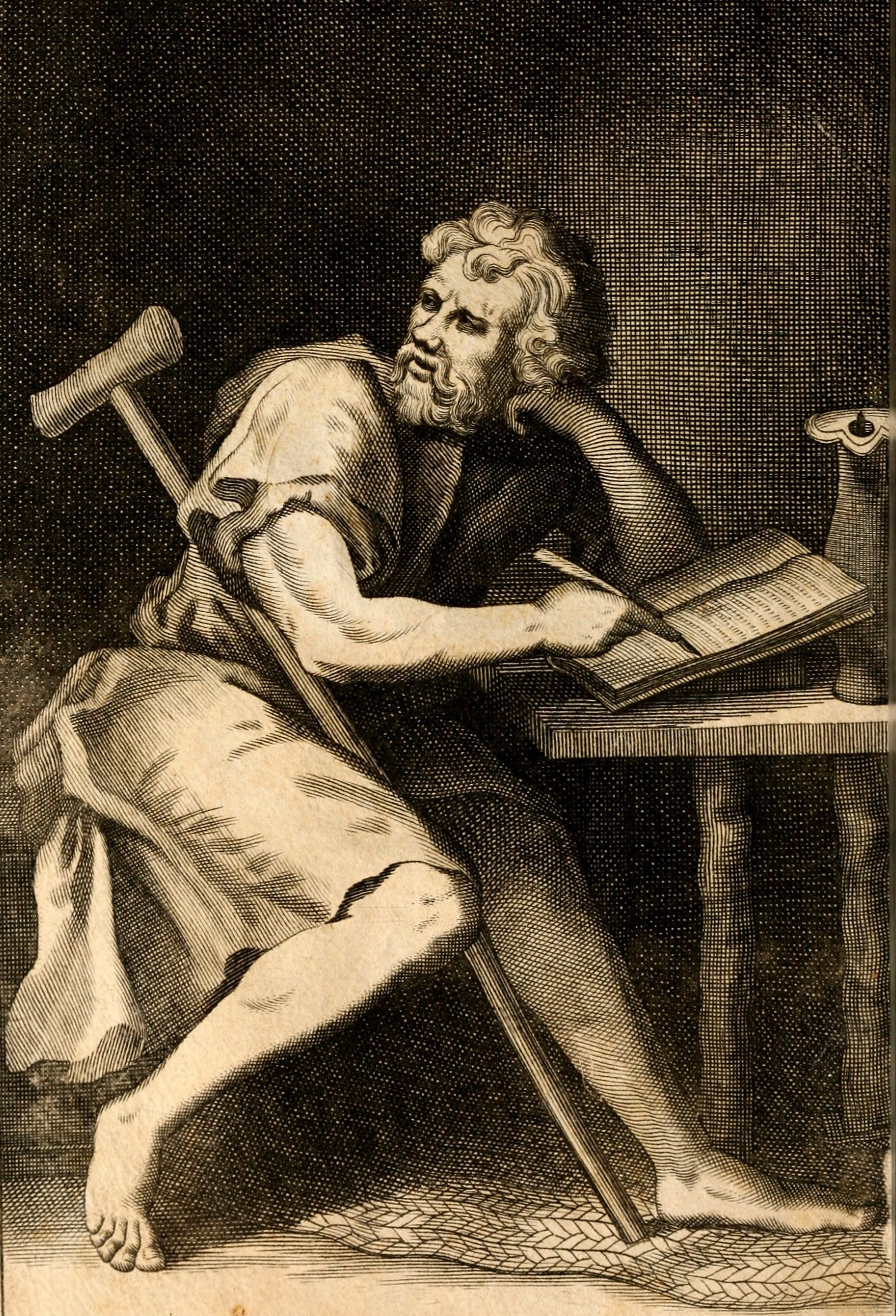
- Eighteenth-century line drawing depicting Epictetus with his crutch
- Born: c. AD 50; Hierapolis, Phrygia (presumed)
- Died: c. 135 (aged c. 85); Nicopolis, Epirus

Philosophical work
- Era: Hellenistic philosophy
- Region: Western philosophy
- School: Stoicism
- Main interests: Ethics
- Notable works: Discourses; Enchiridion
- Notable ideas: Prohairesis; Memento mori

Epictetus (/ˌɛpɪkˈtiːtəs/ EH-pick-TEE-təss; Ancient Greek: Ἐπίκτητος, Epíktētos; c. 50 – c. 135 AD) was a Greek Stoic philosopher. He was born into slavery at Hierapolis, Phrygia (present-day Pamukkale, in western Turkey) and lived in Rome until his banishment, after which he spent the rest of his life in Nicopolis in northwestern Greece.

Epictetus studied Stoic philosophy under Musonius Rufus and after manumission, his formal emancipation from slavery, he began to teach philosophy. When philosophers were banished from Rome by Emperor Domitian toward the end of the first century, Epictetus founded a school of philosophy in Nicopolis. He taught that philosophy is a way of life and not simply a theoretical discipline. To Epictetus, all external events are beyond our control; he argues that we should accept whatever happens calmly and dispassionately. However, he held that individuals are responsible for their own actions, which they can examine and control through rigorous self-discipline. His teachings were written down and published by his pupil Arrian in his Discourses and Enchiridion. They influenced many later thinkers, including Marcus Aurelius, Rabelais, Pascal, Montesquieu, Diderot, and Samuel Johnson.

== Life ==
Having described himself as old in AD 108, Epictetus is presumed to have been born around AD 50, at Hierapolis, Phrygia. The name given by his parents is unknown. The name by which he is known is derived from the word epíktētos (ἐπίκτητος) that in Greek, simply means "gained" or "acquired"; the Greek philosopher Plato, in his Laws, used that term to mean property that is "added to one's hereditary property". Epictetus spent his youth in Rome as a slave to Epaphroditus, a wealthy freedman who was secretary to Nero. Epictetus's social position was thus complicated, combining the low status of a slave with the high status of one with a personal connection to imperial power.

Early in life, Epictetus acquired a passion for philosophy and, with the permission of his wealthy master, he studied Stoic philosophy under Musonius Rufus. Becoming more educated in this way raised his social status. At some point, he became disabled. Celsus, quoted by Origen, wrote that this was because his leg had been deliberately broken by his master. Without citing a cause, Simplicius wrote that Epictetus had been disabled from childhood.

Epictetus obtained his freedom sometime after the death of Nero in AD 68, and he began to teach philosophy in Rome. Around AD 93, when the Roman emperor Domitian banished all philosophers from the city, Epictetus moved to Nicopolis in Epirus, Greece, where he founded a school of philosophy.

His most famous pupil, Arrian, studied under him as a young man (around AD 108) and claimed to have written his famous Discourses based on the notes he took about lectures by Epictetus. Arrian argued that his Discourses should be considered comparable to the Socratic literature. Arrian described Epictetus as a powerful speaker who could "induce his listener to feel just what Epictetus wanted him to feel". Many eminent figures sought conversations with him. Emperor Hadrian was friendly with him, possibly having heard Epictetus speak at his school in Nicopolis.

Epictetus lived a life of great simplicity, with few possessions. He lived alone for a long time, but in his old age, he adopted the child of a friend who otherwise would have been left to die, and raised him with the aid of a woman. It is unclear whether Epictetus and she were married. He died sometime around AD 135. After his death, according to Lucian, his oil lamp was purchased by an admirer for 3,000 drachmae.

== Thought ==
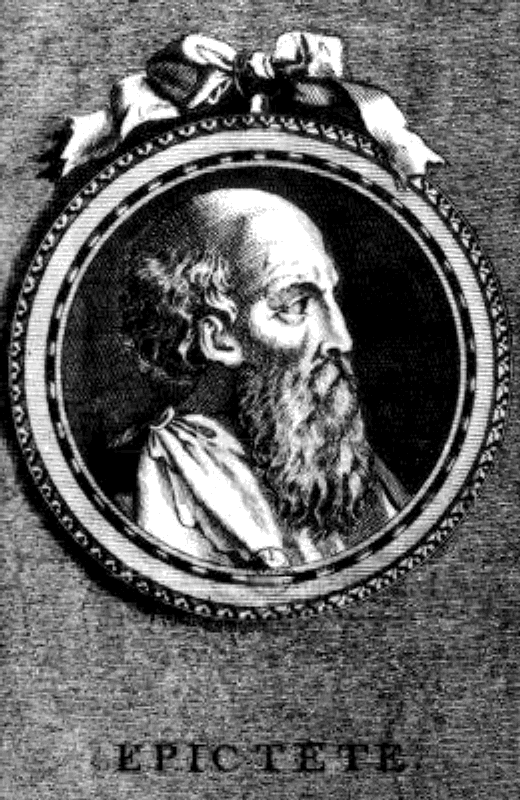
An eighteenth-century engraving depicting Epictetus

Epictetus maintains that the foundation of all philosophy is self-knowledge; that is, the conviction of our ignorance and gullibility ought to be the first subject of our study. Logic provides valid reasoning and certainty in judgment, but it is subordinate to practical needs. He also maintained that the first and most necessary part of philosophy concerns the application of doctrine, for example, that people should not lie. The second concerns reasons, e.g., why people should not lie. The third, lastly, examines and establishes the reasons. This is the logical part, which finds reasons, shows what is a reason, and that a given reason is a correct one. This last part is necessary, but only on account of the second, which again is rendered necessary by the first.

== Legacy ==
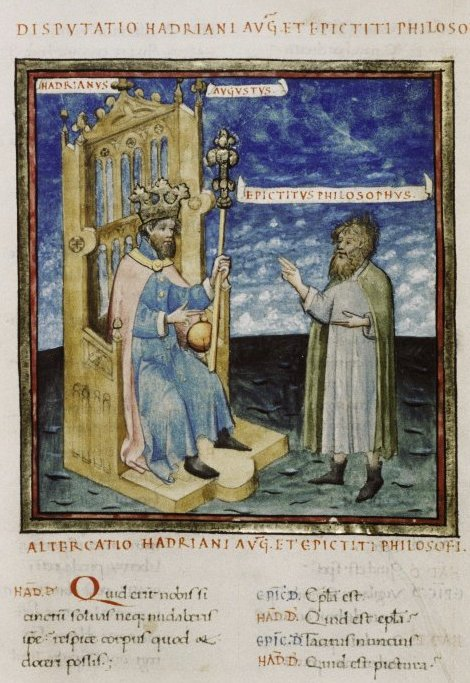
Hadrian and Epictetus are depicted in a fifteenth-century manuscript, Bodleian library

No writings by Epictetus are known. His discourses were transcribed and compiled by his pupil Arrian (c. 86/89 – c. after 146/160 AD). The main work is The Discourses, four books of which have been preserved (out of the original eight). Arrian also compiled a popular digest, entitled the Enchiridion, or Handbook, of Epictetus. In a preface to the Discourses that is addressed to Lucius Gellius, Arrian states that "whatever I heard him say I used to write down, word for word, as best I could, endeavouring to preserve it as a memorial, for my own future use, of his way of thinking and the frankness of his speech". Some scholars, however, have doubted this claim and suggest that Epictetus in fact wrote the Discourses himself, though it is not the consensus opinion.

The philosophy of Epictetus influenced the Roman emperor Marcus Aurelius (AD 121 to 180), who cites Epictetus in his Meditations. Epictetus also appears in a second or third century Dialogue Between the Emperor Hadrian and Epictetus the Philosopher. This short Latin text consists of seventy-three short questions supposedly posed by Hadrian and answered by Epictetus. This dialogue was very popular in the Middle Ages with many translations and adaptations.

Epictetus exhibited an influence on French Enlightenment philosophers, such as Voltaire, Montesquieu, Denis Diderot, and Baron d'Holbach, who all read the Enchiridion when they were students. Blaise Pascal listed Epictetus as among those philosophers he was most familiar with, describing him as a "great mind" who is "among the philosophers of the world who have best understood the duties" of an individual.

In the sixth century, the Neoplatonist philosopher Simplicius wrote an extant commentary on the Enchiridion.

== See also ==
- List of slaves
