= Bryson of Achaea =

4th-century BC Greek philosopher

Bryson of Achaea (or Bryson the Achaean; Greek: Βρύσων ὁ Ἀχαιός Vryson o Acheos, gen.: Βρύσωνος Vrysonos; fl. 330 BC) was an ancient Greek philosopher.

Very little information is known about him. He was said to have been a pupil of Stilpo and Clinomachus, which would mean that he was a philosopher of the Megarian school. He was said to have taught Crates the Cynic, Pyrrho the Skeptic, and Theodorus the Atheist. Diogenes Laërtius includes him among a list of philosophers who left no writings.

He is probably not the same person as Bryson of Heraclea, the sophist and mathematician who seems to have lived in the time of Socrates. The Suda, in its entry on Socrates, may be confusing the two Brysons when it refers to Bryson of Heraclea:

Bryson of Heraclea introduced eristic dialectic after Euclides, whereas Clinomachus augmented it, and whereas many came on account of it, it came to an end with Zeno of Citium, for he gave it the name Stoic, after its location, this having occurred in the 105th Olympiad; but some [say that] Bryson was a student not of Socrates but of Euclides
