= Euphantus =

4th-century BCE Greek philosopher

Euphantus (Greek: Εὔφαντος; fl. c. 320 BCE) of Olynthus was a philosopher of the Megarian school as well as a historian and tragic poet. He was the disciple of Eubulides of Miletus, and the instructor of Antigonus II Gonatas king of Macedonia. He wrote many tragedies, which were well received at the games. He also wrote a very highly esteemed work, On Kingship (Greek: Περὶ Βασιλείας), addressed to Antigonus, and a history of his own times. He lived to a great age.

Athenaeus refers to Euphantus relating a detail about Ptolemy III Euergetes of Egypt, who reigned much later. The discrepancy has been explained variously, by supposing the existence of an Egyptian Euphantus, or by amending "III" to "I".
