= Alexinus =

3rd-century BC Greek philosopher

Alexinus (/ælɪkˈsaɪnəs/; Greek: Ἀλεξῖνος; c. 339–265 BC) of Elis, was a philosopher of Megarian school and a disciple of Eubulides. From his argumentative nature he was facetiously named the wrangler (Greek: Ἐλεγξῖνος), From Elis he went to Olympia, hoping to found a sect which was to be called the Olympian, but his disciples soon became disgusted with the unhealthiness of the place and their scanty means of subsistence, and left him with a single attendant.

None of his doctrines have been preserved, but from the brief mention made of him by Cicero, he seems to have dealt in logical puzzles. Athenaeus mentions a paean which he wrote in honour of Craterus, the Macedonian, and which was sung at Delphi to the sound of the lyre. Alexinus also wrote against Zeno, and against Ephorus the historian. Diogenes Laërtius has preserved some lines on his death which was caused by his being pierced with a reed while swimming in the Alpheus.

In 267–6, Alexinus debated rhetorical questions with Hermarchus the Epicurean. Philodemus in his On Rhetoric quotes a rebuttal by Hermarchus in which he cites Alexinus. Alexinus criticizes the rhetorical sophists for wasting their time on investigation of useless subjects, such as diction, memory, and the interpretation of obscure passages in the poets.
