= Logical determinism =

Logical determinism is the view that a proposition about the future is either necessarily true, or its negation is necessarily true. The argument for this is as follows. By excluded middle, the future tense proposition (‘There will be a sea-battle tomorrow’) is either true now, or its negation is true. But what makes it (or its negation) true is the present existence of a state of affairs – a truthmaker. If so, then the future is determined in the sense that the way things are now – namely the state of affairs that makes ‘There will be a sea-battle tomorrow’ or its negation true – determines the way that things will be. Furthermore, if the past is necessary, in the sense that a state of affairs that existed yesterday cannot be altered, then the state of affairs that made the proposition ‘There will be a sea-battle tomorrow’ true cannot be changed, and so the proposition or its negation is necessarily true, and it is either necessarily the case that there will be a sea-battle tomorrow, or necessarily not the case.

The term ‘logical determinism’ (Logischer Determinismus) was introduced by Moritz Schlick.

Logical determinism seems to present a problem for the conception of free will which requires that different courses of action are possible, for the sea-battle argument suggests that only one course is possible, because necessary. In trying to resolve the problem, the 13th century philosopher Duns Scotus argued in an early work that a future proposition can be understood in two ways: either as signifying something in reality that makes something be true in the future, or simply as signifying that something will be the case. The second sense is weaker in that it does not commit us to any present state of affairs that makes the future proposition true, only a future state of affairs.

== See also ==
- Master Argument
- Determinism
- Free will
- Problem of future contingents
