= Thrasymachus of Corinth =

4th-century BC Greek philosopher

Thrasymachus (Greek: Θρασύμαχος; fl. 4th century BCE) of Corinth, was a philosopher of the Megarian school. Little is known about him except that he was colleague and friend of Ichthyas, and he had presumably been taught by Euclid of Megara, the founder of the school. He was said to have been the teacher of Stilpo.
