= Apollonius Cronus =

4th-century BCE Greek philosopher

Apollonius Cronus (Greek: Ἀπολλώνιος Κρόνος; fl. 4th century BCE) from Cyrene was a philosopher of the Megarian school.

Very little is known about him. He was the pupil of Eubulides, and was the teacher of Diodorus Cronus, as Strabo relates:

Apollonius Cronus, was from Cyrene, ... being the teacher of Diodorus the Dialectician, who also was given the appellation "Cronus," certain persons having transferred the epithet of the teacher to the pupil.

The epithet "Cronus" roughly translates as "old fogey".
