= Terminism (logic) =

Terminism in logic refers to a historical development in medieval scholastic logic. Terminism is defined by rhetorician Walter J. Ong, who links it to nominalism, as "a concomitant of the highly quantified formal logic of medieval scholastic philosophy, and thus contrasts with theology which had closer connections with metaphysics and special commitments to rhetoric" (135).

== See also ==
- History of logic
