= Compossibility =

Philosophical concept

Compossibility is a philosophical concept from Gottfried Wilhelm Leibniz. According to Leibniz, a complete individual thing (for example a person) is characterized by all its properties, and these determine its relations with other individuals. The existence of one individual may negate the possibility of the existence of another. A possible world is made up of individuals that are compossible—that is, individuals that can exist together.

== Compossibility and possible worlds ==
Leibniz indicates that a world is a set of compossible things; i.e., that a world is a kind of collection of things that God could bring into existence. For Leibniz, not even God could bring into existence a world in which there is some contradiction among its members or their properties.

When Leibniz speaks of a possible world, he means a set of compossible, finite things that God could have brought into existence if he were not constrained by the goodness that is part of his nature. The actual world, on the other hand, is simply that set of finite things that is instantiated by God, because it is greatest in goodness, reality and perfection. Naturally, the fact that we are here experiencing this world—the actual world—means that there is at least one possible world. In Leibniz's view, there are an infinite number of possible worlds.

== Relevant works and influence ==
Views on "compossibility" and the closely related best of all possible worlds argument are to be found in On the Ultimate Origination of Things, The Discourse in Metaphysics, On Freedom, and throughout his works. The term itself is found in The Philosophical Writings III [Die philosophischen Schriften III] when Leibniz writes to Louis Bourguet.

Alain Badiou borrows this concept in defining philosophy as the creation of a "space of compossibility" for heterogeneous truths.

Gilles Deleuze uses it in Cinema II taking support from Leibniz's explanation of the problem of future contingents.

== See also ==
- David Lewis's On the Plurality of Worlds (1986)
- Many-worlds interpretation of quantum mechanics
