= Ichthyas =

4th-century BCE Greek philosopher

Ichthyas (Greek: Ἰχθύας; fl. 4th-century BCE), the son of Metallus, was a Greek philosopher and a disciple and successor of Euclid of Megara in the Megarian school. He was a colleague of Thrasymachus of Corinth in the school. Ichthyas is described as a man of great eminence, and Diogenes of Sinope is said to have addressed a dialogue to him.

According to Hilarius Emonds, correcting a previously misread passage in Tertullian's Apologeticus, Ichthyas was a leader in the oligarchic revolt in Megara in 375 BCE.
