= Eubulides =

4th-century BCE Greek philosopher

- Εὐβουλίδης
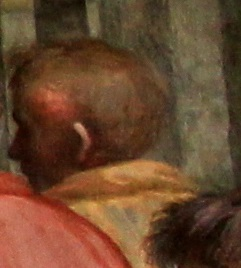
- Born: fl. 4th Century BCE

Philosophical work
- Era: Ancient philosophy
- Region: Ancient Greek philosophy
- School: Megarian school
- Notable students: Demosthenes; Apollonius Cronus; Euphantus; Alexinus
- Main interests: Paradoxes
- Notable ideas: Liar paradox Sorites paradox

Eubulides (Greek: Εὐβουλίδης; fl. 4th century BCE) of Miletus was a philosopher of the Megarian school who is famous for his paradoxes.

== Life ==
According to Diogenes Laërtius, Eubulides was a pupil of Euclid of Megara, the founder of the Megarian school. He was a contemporary of Aristotle, against whom he wrote with great bitterness. He taught logic to Demosthenes, and he is also said to have taught Apollonius Cronus, the teacher of Diodorus Cronus, and the historian Euphantus.

== Paradoxes of Eubulides ==
Eubulides is most famous for inventing the forms of seven famous paradoxes, some of which, however, are also ascribed to Diodorus Cronus:

1. The Liar (pseudomenos) paradox:
  A man says: "What I am saying now is a lie." If the statement is true, then he is lying, even though the statement is true. If the statement is a lie, then he is not actually lying, even though the statement is a lie. Thus, if the speaker is lying, he tells the truth, and vice versa.
2. The Masked Man (enkekalymmenos) paradox:
  "Do you know this masked man?" "No." "But he is your father. So – do you not know your own father?"
3. The Electra (Elektra) paradox:
  Electra does not know that the man approaching her is her brother, Orestes. Electra knows her brother. Does Electra know the man who is approaching?
4. The Overlooked Man (dialanthanôn) paradox:
  Alpha ignored the man approaching him and treated him as a stranger. The man was his father. Did Alpha ignore his own father and treat him as a stranger?
5. The Heap (sôritês) paradox:
  A single grain of sand is certainly not a heap. Nor is the addition of a single grain of sand enough to transform a non-heap into a heap: when we have a collection of grains of sand that is not a heap, then adding but one single grain will not create a heap. And yet we know that at some point we will have a heap.
6. The Bald Man (phalakros) paradox:
  A man with a full head of hair is obviously not bald. Now the removal of a single hair will not turn a non-bald man into a bald one. And yet it is obvious that a continuation of that process must eventually result in baldness.
7. The Horns (keratinês) paradox:
  What you have not lost, you have. But you have not lost horns. Therefore, you have horns.

The first paradox (the Liar) is probably the most famous, and is similar to the famous paradox of Epimenides the Cretan. The second, third and fourth paradoxes are variants of a single paradox and relate to the problem of what it means to "know" something and the identity of objects involved in an affirmation (compare the masked-man fallacy). The fifth and sixth paradoxes are also a single paradox and is usually thought to relate to the vagueness of language. The final paradox, the horns, is a paradox related to presupposition.

== Legacy ==
These paradoxes were very well known in ancient times, some are alluded to by Eubulides' contemporary Aristotle and even partially by Plato. Chrysippus, the Stoic philosopher wrote about the paradoxes developed by Eubulides and characterized the Horns paradox as an intractable problem (aporoi logoi). Aulus Gellius mentions how the discussion of such paradoxes was considered (for him) after-dinner entertainment at the Saturnalia, but Seneca, on the other hand, considered them a waste of time: "Not to know them does no harm, and mastering them does no good."

== Ancient primary sources ==
- Laërtius, Diogenes. "Socrates, with predecessors and followers: Euclides" . Lives of the Eminent Philosophers. Vol. 1:2. Translated by Hicks, Robert Drew (Two volume ed.). Loeb Classical Library. § 108-111.
