= Problem of future contingents =

Statements involving superpositions of truth

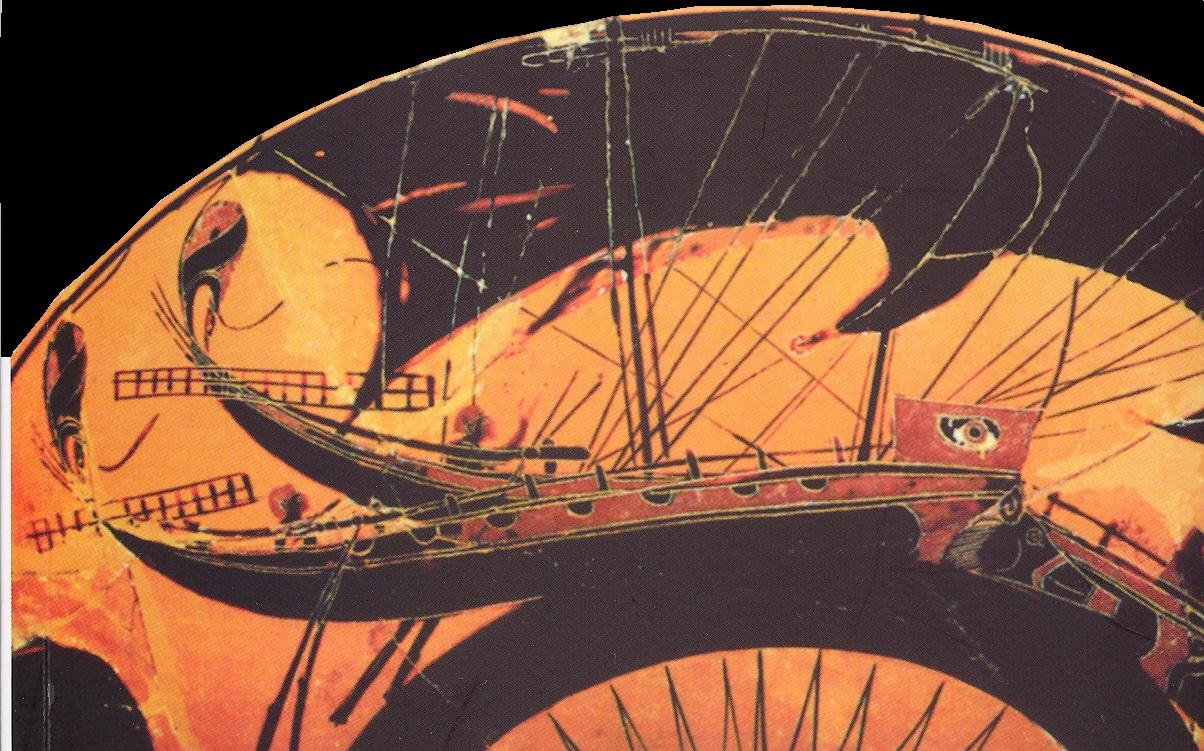
Aristotle: if a sea-battle will not be fought tomorrow, then it was also true yesterday that it will not be fought. But all past truths are necessary truths. Therefore, it is not possible that the battle will be fought.

Future contingent propositions (or simply, future contingents) are statements about states of affairs in the future that are contingent: neither necessarily true nor necessarily false.

The problem of future contingents seems to have been first discussed by Aristotle in chapter 9 of his On Interpretation (De Interpretatione), using the famous sea-battle example. Roughly a generation later, Diodorus Cronus from the Megarian school of philosophy stated a version of the problem in his notorious master argument. The problem was later discussed by Leibniz.

The problem can be expressed as follows. Suppose that a sea-battle will not be fought tomorrow. Then it was also true yesterday (and the week before, and last year) that it will not be fought, since any true statement about what will be the case in the future was also true in the past. But all past truths are now necessary truths; therefore it is now necessarily true in the past, prior and up to the original statement "A sea battle will not be fought tomorrow", that the battle will not be fought, and thus the statement that it will be fought is necessarily false. Therefore, it is not possible that the battle will be fought. In general, if something will not be the case, it is not possible for it to be the case. "For a man may predict an event ten thousand years beforehand, and another may predict the reverse; that which was truly predicted at the moment in the past will of necessity take place in the fullness of time" (De Int. 18b35).

This conflicts with the idea of our own free choice: that we have the power to determine or control the course of events in the future, which seems impossible if what happens, or does not happen, is necessarily going to happen, or not happen. As Aristotle says, if so there would be no need "to deliberate or to take trouble, on the supposition that if we should adopt a certain course, a certain result would follow, while, if we did not, the result would not follow".

== Aristotle's solution ==
Aristotle solved the problem by asserting that the principle of bivalence found its exception in this paradox of the sea battles: in this specific case, what is impossible is that both alternatives can be possible at the same time: either there will be a battle, or there won't. Both options can't be simultaneously taken. Today, they are neither true nor false; but if one is true, then the other becomes false. According to Aristotle, it is impossible to say today if the proposition is correct: we must wait for the contingent realization (or not) of the battle, logic realizes itself afterwards:

One of the two propositions in such instances must be true and the other false, but we cannot say determinately that this or that is false, but must leave the alternative undecided. One may indeed be more likely to be true than the other, but it cannot be either actually true or actually false. It is therefore plain that it is not necessary that of an affirmation and a denial, one should be true and the other false. For in the case of that which exists potentially, but not actually, the rule which applies to that which exists actually does not hold good. (§9)

For Diodorus, the future battle was either impossible or necessary. Aristotle added a third term, contingency, which saves logic while in the same time leaving place for indetermination in reality. What is necessary is not that there will or that there will not be a battle tomorrow, but the dichotomy itself is necessary:

A sea-fight must either take place tomorrow or not, but it is not necessary that it should take place tomorrow, neither is it necessary that it should not take place, yet it is necessary that it either should or should not take place tomorrow. (De Interpretatione, 9, 19 a 30.)

== Islamic philosophy ==
What exactly al-Farabi posited on the question of future contingents is contentious. Nicholas Rescher argues that al-Farabi's position is that the truth value of future contingents is already distributed in an "indefinite way", whereas Fritz Zimmerman argues that al-Farabi endorsed Aristotle's solution that the truth value of future contingents has not been distributed yet. Peter Adamson claims they are both correct as al-Farabi endorses both perspectives at different points in his writing, depending on how far he is engaging with the question of divine foreknowledge.

Al-Farabi's argument about "indefinite" truth values centers around the idea that "from premises that are contingently true, a contingently true conclusion necessarily follows". This means that even though a future contingent will occur, it may not have done so according to present contingent facts; as such, the truth value of a proposition concerning that future contingent is true, but true in a contingent way. al-Farabi uses the following example; if we argue truly that Zayd will take a trip tomorrow, then he will, but crucially:

There is in Zayd the possibility that he stays home....if we grant that Zayd is capable of staying home or of making the trip, then these two antithetical outcomes are equally possible

Al-Farabi's argument deals with the dilemma of future contingents by denying that the proposition P "it is true at $t_1$ that Zayd will travel at $t_2$" and the proposition Q "it is true that at $t_2$ that Zayd travels" would lead us to conclude that necessarily if P then necessarily Q.

He denies this by arguing that "the truth of the present statement about Zayd's journey does not exclude the possibility of Zayd’s staying at home: it just excludes that this possibility will be realized".

== Leibniz ==
Leibniz gave another response to the paradox in §6 of Discourse on Metaphysics: "That God does nothing which is not orderly, and that it is not even possible to conceive of events which are not regular." Thus, even a miracle, the Event by excellence, does not break the regular order of things. What is seen as irregular is only a default of perspective, but does not appear so in relation to universal order, and thus possibility exceeds human logics. Leibniz encounters this paradox because according to him:

Thus the quality of king, which belonged to Alexander the Great, an abstraction from the subject, is not sufficiently determined to constitute an individual, and does not contain the other qualities of the same subject, nor everything which the idea of this prince includes. God, however, seeing the individual concept, or haecceity, of Alexander, sees there at the same time the basis and the reason of all the predicates which can be truly uttered regarding him; for instance that he will conquer Darius and Porus, even to the point of knowing a priori (and not by experience) whether he died a natural death or by poison,- facts which we can learn only through history. When we carefully consider the connection of things we see also the possibility of saying that there was always in the soul of Alexander marks of all that had happened to him and evidences of all that would happen to him and traces even of everything which occurs in the universe, although God alone could recognize them all. (§8)

If everything that happens to Alexander derives from the haecceity of Alexander, then fatalism threatens Leibniz's construction:

We have said that the concept of an individual substance includes once for all everything which can ever happen to it and that in considering this concept one will be able to see everything which can truly be said concerning the individual, just as we are able to see in the nature of a circle all the properties which can be derived from it. But does it not seem that in this way the difference between contingent and necessary truths will be destroyed, that there will be no place for human liberty, and that an absolute fatality will rule as well over all our actions as over all the rest of the events of the world? To this I reply that a distinction must be made between that which is certain and that which is necessary. (§13)

Against Aristotle's separation between the subject and the predicate, Leibniz states:

"Thus the content of the subject must always include that of the predicate in such a way that if one understands perfectly the concept of the subject, he will know that the predicate appertains to it also." (§8)

The predicate (what happens to Alexander) must be completely included in the subject (Alexander) "if one understands perfectly the concept of the subject". Leibniz henceforth distinguishes two types of necessity: necessary necessity and contingent necessity, or universal necessity vs singular necessity. Universal necessity concerns universal truths, while singular necessity concerns something necessary that could not be (it is thus a "contingent necessity"). Leibniz hereby uses the concept of compossible worlds. According to Leibniz, contingent acts such as "Caesar crossing the Rubicon" or "Adam eating the apple" are necessary: that is, they are singular necessities, contingents and accidentals, but which concerns the principle of sufficient reason. Furthermore, this leads Leibniz to conceive of the subject not as a universal, but as a singular: it is true that "Caesar crosses the Rubicon", but it is true only of this Caesar at this time, not of any dictator nor of Caesar at any time (§8, 9, 13). Thus Leibniz conceives of substance as plural: there is a plurality of singular substances, which he calls monads. Leibniz hence creates a concept of the individual as such, and attributes to it events. There is a universal necessity, which is universally applicable, and a singular necessity, which applies to each singular substance, or event. There is one proper noun for each singular event: Leibniz creates a logic of singularity, which Aristotle thought impossible (he considered that there could only be knowledge of generality).

== 20th century ==
One of the early motivations for the study of many-valued logics has been precisely this issue. In the early 20th century, the Polish formal logician Jan Łukasiewicz proposed three truth-values: the true, the false and the as-yet-undetermined. This approach was later developed by Arend Heyting and L. E. J. Brouwer; see Łukasiewicz logic.

Issues such as this have also been addressed in various temporal logics, where one can assert that "Eventually, either there will be a sea battle tomorrow, or there won't be." (Which is true if "tomorrow" eventually occurs.)

=== The modal fallacy ===
By asserting "A sea-fight must either take place tomorrow or not, but it is not necessary that it should take place tomorrow, neither is it necessary that it should not take place, yet it is necessary that it either should or should not take place tomorrow", Aristotle is simply claiming "necessarily (a or not-a)", which is correct.

However, if we then conclude: "If a is the case, then necessarily, a is the case", then this is known as the modal fallacy.

Expressed in another way:

1. If a proposition is true, then it cannot be false.
2. If a proposition cannot be false, then it is necessarily true.
3. Therefore if a proposition is true, it is necessarily true.

That is, there are no contingent propositions. Every proposition is either necessarily true or necessarily false.

The fallacy arises in the ambiguity of the first premise. If we interpret it close to the English, we get:

4. P entails it is not possible that not-P
5. It is not possible that not-P entails it is necessary that P
6. Therefore, P entails it is necessary that P

However, if we recognize that the English expression (i) is potentially misleading, that it assigns a necessity to what is simply nothing more than a necessary condition, then we get instead as our premises:

7. It is not possible that (P and not P)
8. (It is not possible that not P) entails (it is necessary that P)

From these latter two premises, one cannot validly infer the conclusion:

9. P entails it is necessary that P

== See also ==
- Logical determinism
- Free will
- Principle of distributivity
- Principle of plenitude
- Truth-value link
- In Borges' The Garden of Forking Paths, both alternatives happen, thus leading to what Deleuze calls "incompossible worlds"
