= Philo the Dialectician =

Greek philosopher

Philo the Dialectician (Greek: Φίλων; fl. 300 BC) was a Greek philosopher of the Megarian (Dialectical) school. He is sometimes called Philo of Megara although the city of his birth is unknown. He is most famous for the debate he had with his teacher Diodorus Cronus concerning the idea of the possible and the criteria of the truth of conditional statements.

== Life ==
Little is known about the life of Philo. He was a disciple of Diodorus Cronus, and was a friend of Zeno, the founder of Stoicism. Diogenes Laërtius states that Zeno "used to dispute very carefully with Philo the logician and study along with him—hence Zeno, who was the junior, had as great an admiration for Philo as his master Diodorus."

Jerome refers to Philo as the teacher of Carneades, which is chronologically impossible. Diogenes Laërtius mentions a (presumably different) Philo who was a disciple of Pyrrho.

== Writings ==
One of Philo's works was called Menexenus in which he mentioned the five daughters of Diodorus who were all distinguished dialecticians. Two of Chrysippus' logical works were responses to books by Philo, one was directed at "Philo's Work on Meanings", and the other at "Philo's Work on Moods".

== Philosophy ==
Philo disputed with Diodorus respecting the idea of the possible and the criteria of the truth of conditional statements.

In regards to things possible, Diodorus maintained that possible was identical with necessary, i.e. that possible is "that which either is or will be true". Philo instead defined possible as "that which is capable of being true by the proposition's own nature", thus a statement like "this piece of wood can burn" is possible, even if it spent its entire existence on the bottom of the ocean.

Both Philo and Diodorus sought for criteria for the correct form of conditional propositions, and each of them did so in a manner corresponding to what he maintained respecting the idea of the possible. Philo regarded a conditional as true unless it has both a true antecedent and a false consequent. Precisely, let T_{0} and T_{1} be true statements, and let F_{0} and F_{1} be false statements; then, according to Philo, each of the following conditionals is a true statement, because it is not the case that the consequent is false while the antecedent is true (it is not the case that a false statement is asserted to follow from a true statement):

- If T_{0}, then T_{1}
- If F_{0}, then T_{0}
- If F_{0}, then F_{1}

The following conditional does not meet this requirement, and is therefore a false statement according to Philo:

- If T_{0}, then F_{0}

Indeed, Sextus says "According to [Philo], there are three ways in which a conditional may be true, and one in which it may be false." Philo's criterion of truth is what would now be called a truth-functional definition of "if ... then"; it is the definition used in modern logic.

In contrast, Diodorus allowed the validity of conditionals only when the antecedent clause could never lead to an untrue conclusion. A century later, the Stoic philosopher Chrysippus attacked the assumptions of both Philo and Diodorus.
