= Diodorus Cronus =

Ancient Greek philosopher and dialectician

Diodorus Cronus (/ˌdaɪəˈdɔːrəs ˈkroʊnəs/; Greek: Διόδωρος Κρόνος; died c. 284 BC) was an Ancient Greek philosopher and dialectician connected to the Megarian school. He was most notable for logic innovations, including his master argument formulated in response to Aristotle's discussion of future contingents.

== Life ==
Diodorus was the son of Ameinias of Iasus in Caria. He lived in the court of Alexandria in the reign of Ptolemy I Soter, who is said to have given him the surname of Cronus ("old fogey") on account of his inability to solve at once some dialectic problem proposed by Stilpo, when the two philosophers were dining with the king. Diodorus is said to have taken that disgrace so much to heart that after his return from the meal, and writing a treatise on the problem, he died in despair. However, according to Strabo, Diodorus himself adopted the surname of Cronus from his teacher, Apollonius Cronus. Diodorus is thought to have died around 284 BC; his date of birth is unknown. It was once thought that he was old enough to have influenced Aristotle (384–322 BC), but there is no strong evidence for this.

Diodorus was particularly celebrated for his great dialectic skill, for which he was called The Dialectician. This effectively became his surname, and descended even to his five daughters, Menexene, Argia, Theognis, Artemesia, and Pantaclea, who were likewise distinguished as dialecticians. His pupils included Philo the Dialectician, and Zeno of Citium—the founder of the Stoic school. Although influenced by the Megarian school it is not clear how closely Diodorus and his fellow dialecticians were connected to that particular philosophical school.

== Philosophy ==
He was most notable for logic innovations, including his master argument formulated in response to Aristotle's discussion of future contingents. Diogenes Laërtius says that Diodorus also made use of the Sorites paradox, and is said to have invented two others of the same kind, viz. The Masked Man and The Horns, which are, however, also ascribed to Eubulides. Aulus Gellius claims that he also rejected the view that words are ambiguous, any uncertainty in understanding was always due to speakers expressing themselves obscurely. According to Sextus Empiricus, he also maintained that space was indivisible, and consequently that motion was impossible. He further denied the coming into existence and all multiplicity both in time and in space; but he considered the things that fill up space as one whole composed of an infinite number of indivisible particles.

=== Master argument ===
Aristotle, in his work On Interpretation, had wrestled with the problem of future contingents. In particular, whether one can meaningfully regard future contingents as true or false now, if the future is open; and, if so: how?

In response, Diodorus maintained that possible was identical with necessary (i.e., not contingent); so that the future is as certain and defined as the past. Alexander of Aphrodisias tells us that Diodorus believed that that alone is possible which either is happening now, or will happen at some future time. When speaking about facts of an unrecorded past, we know that a given fact either occurred, or did not occur—without knowing which of the two is true; therefore, we affirm only that the fact may have occurred. So too about the future: either the assertion that a given fact will—at some time—occur, or else the assertion that it will never occur, is positively true; the assertion that it may or may not occur, at some time or another, represents only our ignorance as to which of the two is true. That which will never at any time occur is, in a word, impossible.

Diodorus went on to formulate an argument that became known as the master argument or ruling argument (Greek: ὁ κυριεύων λόγος / ho kurieuôn logos). The most succinct description of it is provided by Epictetus:

The argument called the master argument appears to have been proposed from such principles as these: there is in fact a common contradiction between one another in these three propositions, each two being in contradiction to the third. The propositions are: (1) every past truth must be necessary; (2) that an impossibility does not follow a possibility; (3) something is possible which neither is nor will be true. Diodorus observing this contradiction employed the probative force of the first two for the demonstration of this proposition: That nothing is possible which is not true and never will be.

Epictetus' description of the master argument is not in the form as it would have been presented by Diodorus, which makes it difficult to know the precise nature of his argument. To modern logicians, it is not obvious why these three premises are inconsistent, or why the first two should lead to the rejection of the third. Modern interpretations therefore assume that there must have been extra premises in the argument tacitly assumed by Diodorus and his contemporaries.

One possible reconstruction is as follows: For Diodorus, if a future event is not going to happen, then it was true in the past that it would not happen. Since every past truth is necessary (proposition 1), it was necessary that in the past it would not happen. Since the impossible cannot follow from the possible (proposition 2), it must have always been impossible for the event to occur. Therefore if something will not be true, it will never be possible for it to be true, and thus proposition 3 is shown to be false.

Epictetus goes on to point out that Panthoides, Cleanthes, and Antipater of Tarsus made use of the second and third proposition to demonstrate that the first proposition was false. Chrysippus, on the other hand, agreed with Diodorus that everything true as an event in the past is necessary, but attacked Diodorus' view that the possible must be either what is true or what will be true. He thus made use of the first and third proposition to demonstrate that the second proposition was false.

== Nom de plume ==
During the 1960s and 1970s the philosopher Richard Clyde Taylor also coauthored several articles under the nom de plume of Diodorus Cronus which included: "Time, Truth and Ability" (Analysis, 1965) and "The Necessity of Everything That One Does" (The Southern Journal of Philosophy, 1971).
