= List of ethicists =

List of ethicists including religious or political figures recognized by those outside their tradition as having made major contributions to ideas about ethics, or raised major controversies by taking strong positions on previously unexplored problems.

All are known for an ethical work or problem, but a few are primarily authors or satirists, or known as a mediator, politician, futurist or scientist, rather than as an ethicist or philosopher. Some controversial figures are included, some of whom you may see as bad examples. A few are included because their names have become synonymous with certain ethical debates, but only if they personally elaborated an ethical theory justifying their actions.

== A ==
- Peter Abelard
- Ambedkar
- John Stevens Cabot Abbott
- Mortimer Adler
- Thomas Aquinas
- Nomy Arpaly
- Ambrose
- Andronicus of Rhodes
- Julia Annas
- G. E. M. Anscombe
- Karl-Otto Apel
- Jacob M. Appel
- Aristotle
- Aristoxenus
- John Arthur
- Benedict Ashley, OP
- Ashoka
- Augustine of Hippo
- Avicenna
- Joxe Azurmendi

== B ==
- Bahá'u'lláh
- Franz Xaver von Baader
- Francis Bacon
- Alain Badiou
- Samuel Bailey
- Tom Beauchamp
- Lewis White Beck
- Saint Robert Bellarmine, S.J.
- David Benatar
- Friedrich Eduard Beneke
- Jeremy Bentham
- Thomas Berry
- Maurice Blanchot
- Dietrich Bonhoeffer
- Murray Bookchin
- George Boole
- Nick Bostrom
- Daniel Brock
- Martin Buber
- Gautama Buddha
- Mario Bunge
- Judith Butler

== C ==
- Albert Camus
- Arthur Caplan
- Roger Chao
- James Childress
- Saint Bernard of Clairvaux, O.Cist
- Randy Cohen
- Confucius
- John M. Cooper
- Michael Cranford
- Alice Crary
- Roger Crisp
- Simon Critchley
- David Crocker
- Noam Chomsky

== D ==
- Mary Daly
- Norman Daniels
- Partha Dasgupta
- Abraham ibn Daud
- Charles De Koninck
- Miguel A. De La Torre
- Cora Diamond
- Philip Doddridge
- Elliot N. Dorff
- Julia Driver
- Ronald Dworkin

== E ==
- Epicurus
- Rudolf Christoph Eucken

== F ==
- Johann Albert Fabricius
- Ismail al-Faruqi
- Nosson Tzvi Finkel
- John Finnis
- Joseph Fins
- Owen Flanagan
- Joseph Fletcher
- Philippa Foot
- William K. Frankena
- Alexander Campbell Fraser
- R. Edward Freeman
- R. G. Frey
- Erich Fromm

== G ==
- Raimond Gaita
- Mohandas Gandhi
- Reginald Garrigou-Lagrange, OP
- David Gauthier
- Alan Gewirth
- Al-Ghazali
- Allan Gibbard
- Peter Goldie
- Victor Gollancz
- Celia Green
- Thomas Hill Green
- Stanley Grenz
- Hugo Grotius
- Jean-Marie Guyau
- Tenzin Gyatso, the 14th Dalai Lama

== H ==
- Jürgen Habermas
- Hammurabi
- R. M. Hare
- Gilbert Harman
- Sam Harris
- John Harsanyi
- Robert S. Hartman
- Stanley Hauerwas
- Henry Hazlitt
- Paul Hawken
- Martin Heidegger
- Erich Heller
- Claude Adrien Helvétius
- Johann Friedrich Herbart
- Abraham Joshua Heschel
- Hierocles of Alexandria
- James Hinton
- Thomas Hobbes
- Wau Holland
- Robert L. Holmes
- Oscar Horta
- Hans-Hermann Hoppe
- David Hume
- John Peters Humphrey - author of UN Declaration of Universal Human Rights
- Edward Hundert
- Rosalind Hursthouse
- Francis Hutcheson
- Thomas Henry Huxley

== I ==
- Lauri Ingman
- Alija Izetbegović

== J ==
- Jane Jacobs - author of Systems of Survival
- Paul Janet
- Francis Jeffrey
- Théodore Simon Jouffroy
- Jesus of Nazareth
- John Paul II

== K ==
- Shelly Kagan
- Immanuel Kant - Metaphysic of Ethics
- Rushworth Kidder
- Søren Kierkegaard
- Martin Luther King Jr.
- İoanna Kuçuradi
- Israel Kirzner
- Lawrence Kohlberg
- Mario Kopić
- Christine Korsgaard
- David Korten
- Tadeusz Kotarbiński
- Peter Kropotkin
- Hans Küng

== L ==
- Louis Lavelle
- Katarzyna de Lazari-Radek
- Aldo Leopold
- Barron H. Lerner
- Emmanuel Levinas
- Saint Alphonsus Liguori CSsR
- Andrew Linzey
- D. Stephen Long
- John Locke
- Antoine Garaby de La Luzerne
- Moshe Chaim Luzzatto

== M ==
- Niccolò Machiavelli
- Alasdair MacIntyre
- J. L. Mackie
- William MacAskill
- Maimonides
- Mao Zedong
- Marcion of Sinope
- Jack Mahoney
- Jacques Maritain
- James Martineau
- John McDowell
- Glenn McGee
- Ralph McInerny
- Donella Meadows
- Peter Medawar
- Mencius
- Menedemus
- Alan Morinis
- Mozi
- Fatema Mernissi
- Mary Midgley
- James Mill
- John Stuart Mill
- Moses - the Ethical Decalogue
- Michele Moody-Adams
- G. E. Moore
- Radhakamal Mukerjee
- Iris Murdoch

== N ==
- Thomas Nagel
- Seyyed Hossein Nasr
- Oswald von Nell-Breuning
- H. Richard Niebuhr
- Reinhold Niebuhr
- Friedrich Nietzsche
- Carlos Santiago Nino
- Karl Immanuel Nitzsch
- David L. Norton
- Robert Nozick
- Martha Nussbaum
- Guru Nanak

== O ==
- Hilda D. Oakeley
- John Joseph O'Connor
- Onora O'Neill
- Michel Onfray

== P ==
- Blaise Pascal
- Bahya ibn Paquda
- Derek Parfit
- David Pearce
- Philip Pettit
- Philo of Alexandria
- Plato
- Tess Posner
- Noel Preston
- Richard Price
- Prodicus

== Q ==
- Quintilian

== R ==
- Fazlur Rahman
- Peter Railton
- Ayn Rand
- John Rawls
- Joseph Raz
- Tom Regan
- George Croom Robertson
- Richard Rorty
- W. D. Ross
- Murray Rothbard
- Jean-Jacques Rousseau
- John Ruskin
- Emma Rush
- Bertrand Russell

== S ==
- Marquis de Sade
- Edward Said
- Israel Salanter
- Michael J. Sandel
- Julian Savulescu
- Ziauddin Sardar
- John Ralston Saul
- Geoffrey Sayre-McCord
- Giovanni Battista Scaramelli
- T. M. Scanlon
- Zalman Schachter-Shalomi
- Samuel Scheffler
- Max Scheler
- Friedrich Schiller
- Friedrich Daniel Ernst Schleiermacher
- Karl Wilhelm Friedrich von Schlegel
- Moritz Schlick
- Frank Schmalleger
- David Schmidtz
- Arthur Schopenhauer
- Bart Schultz
- Albert Schweitzer
- Amartya Sen
- Lucius Annaeus Seneca
- Russ Shafer-Landau
- Henry Sidgwick
- Georg Simmel
- Peter Singer
- B. F. Skinner
- J. J. C. Smart
- Adam Smith
- Holly Martin Smith
- Michael A. Smith
- Wesley J. Smith
- Vladimir Solovyov
- Margaret Somerville
- Herbert Spencer
- Baruch Spinoza
- John Shelby Spong
- Walter Terence Stace
- Olaf Stapledon
- Charles Stevenson
- Dugald Stewart
- Max Stirner
- Stobaeus
- Ira F. Stone
- Jeffrey Stout
- Leslie Stephen
- David Friedrich Strauss
- Sun Yat-sen

== T ==
- Gabriele Taylor
- Richard Clyde Taylor
- Jenny Teichman
- Larry Temkin
- Judith Jarvis Thomson
- Paul Tillich
- Hsun Tzu
- Leo Tolstoy
- Joan Tronto
- Konstantin Tsiolkovsky
- Thiruvalluvar

== U to Z ==
- Henry Babcock Veatch
- Justin Shaun Veeran
- Francisco de Vitoria
- Johann Georg Walch
- William George Ward
- Otto Weininger
- William Whewell
- Philip Wicksteed
- Benjamin Wiker
- Daniel Wikler
- Bernard Williams
- Susan Wolf
- Christian Wolff (philosopher)
- William Wollaston
- Xenocrates
- Xunzi
- John Howard Yoder
- Simcha Zissel Ziv
- Theodor Zwinger
- Swami Vivekananda
- Zoroaster

== See also ==
- Index of ethics articles
- List of ethics topics
- List of philosophers
- Outline of ethics
