= Dewitt H. Parker =

American philosopher (1885–1949)

Dewitt H. Parker (1885–1949) was a professor of philosophy at the University of Michigan. Appointed department chair in 1929, Parker published works on metaphysics, aesthetics, and ethics.

== Publications ==
=== Books ===
- (1917) The Self and Nature
- (1920) The Principles of Aesthetics (available in the public domain)
- (1926) The Analysis of Art
- (1931) Human Values
- (1941) Experience and Substance
- (1957) The Philosophy of Value (with William Frankena)

=== Journal articles ===
- (1950) Is There a Third Kind of Knowledge? Philosophical Review 59 (2):221-229.
- (1946) Rejoinder to Mr. Lepley, Philosophical Review 55 (3):288-291.
- (1945) Esse Est Percipi, with Particular Reference to Number, Journal of Philosophy 42 (11):281-291.
- (1945) Knowledge by Acquaintance, Philosophical Review 54 (1):1-18.
- (1945) Knowledge by Description, Philosophical Review 54 (5):458-488.
- (1944) Some Comments on "Reformed Materialism and Intrinsic Endurance" Philosophical Review 53 (4):383-391.
- (1938) Value and Existence Ethics 48 (4):475-486.
- (1934) Reflexive Relations: A Rejoinder. Philosophical Review 43 (3):295-300.
- (1934) The Metaphysics of Value I International Journal of Ethics 44 (3):293-312.
- (1933) Reflexive Relations, Philosophical Review 42 (3):303-311.
- (1932) A Symposium: The Aim and Content of Graduate Training in Ethics, with George P. Adams, C. J. Ducasse, Walter Goodnow Everett, DeWitt Parker, F.C. Sharp & J.H. Turfs, International Journal of Ethics 43 (1):53-64.
- (1929) On the Notion of Value, Philosophical Review 38 (4):303-325.
- (1928) Alfred Henry Lloyd, 1864-1927 with Arthur Lyon Cross & R.M. Wenley, Journal of Philosophy 25 (5):124-130.
- (1910) Knowledge and Volition, Journal of Philosophy, Psychology and Scientific Methods 7 (22):594-602.
