= Howison Lectures in Philosophy =

Moral and intellectual lecture series

The Howison Lectures in Philosophy are a lecture series established in 1919 by friends and former students of George Howison, who served as the Mills Professor of Intellectual and Moral Philosophy and Civil Polity at the University of California, Berkeley.

Professor Howison held the reasoned conviction that this world to its very depth is kindred to the human spirit; that it is a community of free persons, finite and infinite, sustained by the vision of the Perfect; and all his great powers were directed to awaken in others a loyalty to these ideas. And those, it would seem, would most speak from a foundation in his memory who were able to share with him this high purpose and conviction.

— Founding donors of the Howison Lectures in Philosophy

== Past lectures ==
- 1922 — William Ernest Hocking — "Naturalism and the Belief in Purpose"; "Intuitionism and Idealism"; "Realism and Mysticism"
- 1923 — Arthur Oncken Lovejoy — "The Discontinuities of Evolution"
- 1925 — William Pepperell Montague — "Time and the Fourth Dimension"
- 1925 — Ralph Barton Perry — "A Modernist View of National Ideals"
- 1926 — Clarence Irving Lewis — "The Pragmatic Element in Knowledge"
- 1927 — Evander Bradley McGilvary — "Space and Time"
- 1929 — Robert Mark Wenley
- 1930 — James Hayden Tufts — "Recent Ethical Theories"
- 1931 — John Dewey — "Thought and Context"
- 1932 — Walter Goodnow Everett — "The Uniqueness of Man"
- 1933 — F. C. S. Schiller — "Theory and Practice"
- 1934 — G. Watts Cunningham — "Perspective and Contact in the Meaning Situation"
- 1935 — Frederick James Eugene Woodbridge — "An Approach to a Theory of Nature"
- 1936 — Henry W. Stuart — "Knowledge and Self-Consciousness"
- 1937 — Heinrich Gomperz — "Limits of Cognition and Exigencies of Action"
- 1941 — George Holland Sabine — "Social Studies and Objectivity"
- 1941 — George Edward Moore — "Certainty"
- 1943 — Charles Montague Bakewell — "Philosophy Goes to War"
- 1944 — Curt John Ducasse — "The Method of Knowledge in Philosophy"
- 1945 — Harvey Gates Townsend — "The History of Townsend"
- 1946 — Wilmon Henry Sheldon
- 1947 — Alexander Meiklejohn — "Inclinations and Obligations"
- 1949 — George Boas — "The Acceptance of Time"
- 1954 — Brand Blanshard — "The Impasse of Ethics - and a Way Out"
- 1954 — Gilbert Ryle — "Some Problems in the Theory of Meaning"
- 1954 — Walter Terence Stace — "Mysticism and Human Reason"
- 1956 — Józef Maria Bocheński — "Logic and Philosophy"
- 1957 — Kurt von Fritz — "Aristotle's Contribution to the Theory and Practice of Historiography"
- 1957 — John Wisdom — "Paradox and Discovery"
- 1959 — Willard Van Orman Quine — "The Assuming of Objects"
- 1960 — Ernest Nagel — "The Cognitive Status of Theories"
- 1961 — Gabriel Marcel — "Man, Techniques, and Meta-Techniques"
- 1963 — Henry H. Price — "Causes of Belief and Reasons for Belief"
- 1963 — Peter Geach — "Assertion"
- 1963 — Elizabeth Anscombe — "The Intentionality of Sensation: A Grammatical Feature"
- 1964 — Carl G. Hempel — "Problems of Induction"
- 1968 — Stuart Hampshire — "Sincerity and Uncertainty"
- 1971 — Gunther Patzing — "Truth, Determinism and Uncertainty"
- 1977 — Saul Kripke — "Wittgenstein on Rules and Private Language: An Exposition"
- 1977 — Peter F. Strawson — "Perception and Its Objects"; "Reference and Its Roots"
- 1978 — Robert Nozick — "The Identity of the Self. Why is there Something Rather than Nothing?"
- 1979 — Patrick Suppes — "The Limits of Rationality"
- 1979 — John Rawls — "Constructivist Moral Conceptions"
- 1979 — David Kellogg Lewis — "Causal Explanation"
- 1980 — Michel Foucault — "Truth and Subjectivity"
- 1981 — Hilary Putnam — "The Transcendence of Reason": 1) "Why There Isn't a Ready-Made World"; 2) "Why Reason Can't Be Naturalized"
- 1983 — Richard Rorty — "Relativism"
- 1984 — Gregory Vlastos — "Socrates' Disavowal of Knowledge"; "The Socratic Fallacy"
- 1985 — Nelson Goodman — "A Reconception of Philosophy"
- 1986 — Michael A. E. Dummett — "The Justification of Logical Laws"
- 1987 — Thomas Nagel — "Moral Conflict and Political Legitimacy"
- 1988 — Bernard Williams — "Philosophy and the Fragments of Enlightenment"
- 1988 — Jürgen Habermas
- 1994 — Noam Chomsky — "Naturalism and Dualism in the Study of Language and Mind"
- 1996 — Myles Burnyeat — "Freedom, Anger, Tranquility - An Archaeology of Feeling"; "Ancient Freedoms"; "Anger and Revenge"; "Happiness and Tranquility"
- 1999 — Nancy Cartwright — "The Dappled World"
- 2000 — Michael Frede — "On Aristotle's Notion of the Soul"
- 2002 — Ronald M. Dworkin — "Truth, Interpretation, and the Point of Moral Philosophy"
- 2002 — Stanley Cavell — "Philosophy the Day After Tomorrow: Moments in Nietzsche, Jane Austen, et cetera."; "The Wittgensteinian Event
- 2004 — David Kaplan — "The Meaning of 'Ouch' and 'Oops'"
- 2005 — Judith Jarvis Thomson — "Normativity"
- 2006 — John McDowell — "Intention in Action"
- 2007 — Fred Dretske — "What We See"
- 2007 — T. M. Scanlon — "The Ethics of Blame"
- 2009 — John Perry — "Thinking and Talking About the Self"
- 2010 — Ian Hacking — "Proof, Truth, Hands, and Mind"
- 2013 — Robert Brandom — "Reason, Genealogy, and the Hermeneutics of Magnanimity"
- 2014 — Sarah Broadie — "The Theoretical Impulse in Plato and Aristotle"
- 2015 — Kwame Anthony Appiah — "The Philosophy of "As If""
- 2016 — Christine M. Korsgaard — "Animal Selves and the Good"
- 2017 — Gisela Striker — "Cicero’s De Officiis – Stoic Ethics for Non-Stoics"
- 2018 — Joseph Raz — "Identity and Social Bonds"
- 2019 — Philip Kitcher — "Progress in the Sciences and in the Arts"

== See also ==
- Center for New Media Lectures
- Tarski Lectures
