= Brian Barry =

English philosopher (1936–2009)

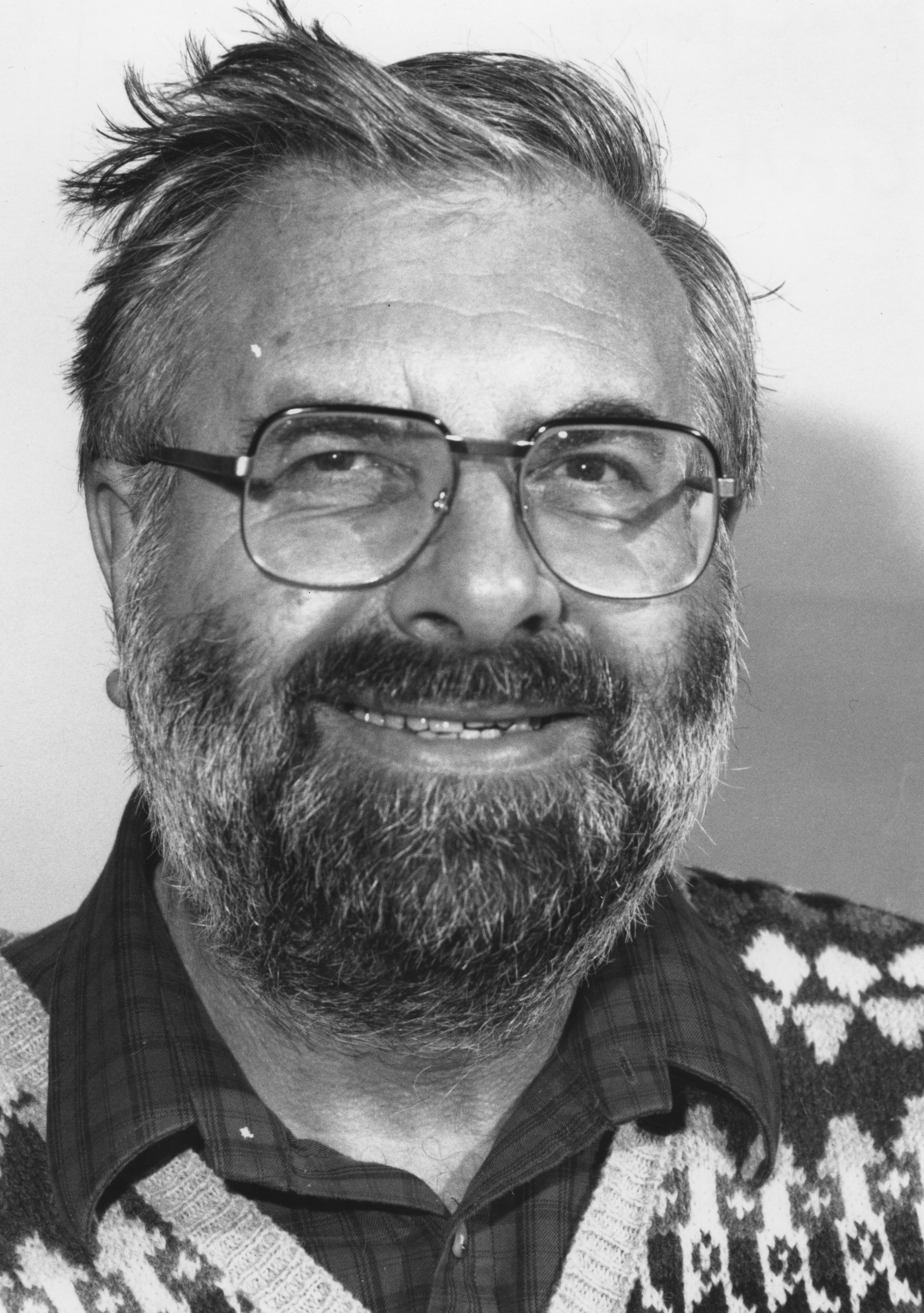
- Barry in the 1980s
- Born: 7 August 1936
- Died: 10 March 2009 (aged 72)
- Occupations: Moral and political philosopher

Academic background
- Education: Queen's College, Oxford (BA, MA, PhD)
- Thesis: The language of political argument (1963)
- Doctoral advisor: H. L. A. Hart

Brian Barry, FBA (7 August 1936 – 10 March 2009) was a moral and political philosopher. He was educated at the Queen's College, Oxford, obtaining the degrees of B.A. and D.Phil. under the direction of H. L. A. Hart.

Along with David Braybrooke, Richard E. Flathman, Felix Oppenheim, and Abraham Kaplan, he is widely credited with having fused analytic philosophy and political science. Barry also fused political theory and social choice theory and was a persistent critic of public choice theory.

== Life ==
During his early career, Barry held teaching posts at the University of Birmingham, Keele University and the University of Southampton. In 1965 he was appointed a teaching fellow at University College, Oxford and then Nuffield College. In 1969 he became a professor at Essex University.

Barry was Lieber Professor Emeritus of Political Philosophy at Columbia University and Professor Emeritus of Political Science at the London School of Economics. He was awarded the Johan Skytte Prize in Political Science in 2001. Barry also taught at the University of Chicago, in the departments of philosophy and political science. During this time he edited the journal Ethics, helping raise its publication standards. Under his editorship, it became perhaps the leading journal for moral and political philosophy.

He was elected a Fellow of the American Academy of Arts and Sciences in 1978. Barry was a Distinguished Supporter of the British Humanist Association, and was awarded an honorary doctorate by the University of York in 2006.

In 2014, the British Academy, in partnership with Cambridge University Press and the British Journal of Political Science, founded an annual prize in political science in his honour: the Brian Barry Prize in Political Science.

== Selected publications ==
- Why Social Justice Matters (Polity 2005)
- Culture & Equality: An Egalitarian Critique of Multiculturalism (2001)
- Justice as Impartiality (1995)
- Liberty and Justice: Essays in Political Theory (1991)
- Theories of Justice (Berkeley, 1989)
- Democracy, Power, and Justice: Essays in Political Theory (Oxford, 1989)
- The Liberal Theory of Justice (1973)
- Sociologists, Economists and Democracy (1970)
- Political Argument. 1965 – via Internet Archive.
