= Marcus George Singer =

American philosopher (1926–2016)

Marcus George Singer (January 4, 1926 – February 21, 2016) was an American philosopher. His works include Generalization in Ethics – An Essay in the Logic of Ethics, with the Rudiments of a System of Moral Philosophy (1961).

== Personal life ==
Marcus George Singer was born in 1926 in New York City. His father, David Singer, a lawyer, died when MGS was 9 years old from a rare autoimmune disease. His mother, Esther Kobre Singer, was a concert level pianist and received awards from the City of New York for her service typing books in braille. Her father and uncle, through their small bank, provided loans to many Jews to pay passage to the USA (Kobre Bank, NYC). MGS enlisted in the US Army Air Corps Reserves in 1943. From 1944 to 1945 he served in the U.S. Army Air Force as an aerial engineer and was training as a pilot. After mustering out of the army, he attended the University of Illinois, met his future wife, Blanche Ladenson, and graduated with High Honors in Philosophy, Phi Beta Kappa in 1948. In 1952, Singer earned his Ph.D. in Philosophy at Cornell University. Immediately on receiving his doctorate, Singer accepted a position teaching in the Department of Philosophy at the University of Wisconsin–Madison, where he continued to teach until 1994. Marcus lived with his wife, Blanche Ladenson Singer, for almost 70 years. He died February 21, 2016, after battling chronic illness, likely autoimmune. His curiosity, humor, enthusiasm for life and the larger issues of living continued almost until the end of life. Marcus has two daughters, Karen and Debra, and one grand child, Isaac. Karen Singer is Principal and Artistic Director of Karen Singer Tileworks. Debra Singer is a photographer/designer focused on environmental advocacy, also working at UCSF Medical Center in research program administration (Managing Director, Center for Cellular Construction, UCSF ). One of his closest friends was Claudia Card, Emma Goldman Professor of Philosophy, UW–Madison, whom he mentored since her undergraduate years at UW. She pre-deceased him by six months.

His brilliance manifested at a young age, with insatiable curiosity, quick wittedness, an interest in right and wrong. He served in the US Army Airforce to fight fascism in WW II - the war ended before he was sent to a front, but living through that time of evil profoundly influenced his thinking and actions. His family lost family in Germany and throughout Europe. His brother-in-law Lawrence Cane served in the Abraham Lincoln Brigade, fighting against Franco in Spain and was blacklisted as a Communist thinker (See 'Fighting Fascism in Spain: The World War II Letters of An American Veteran of the Spanish Civil War.') MG Singer persisted in focusing on moral philosophy and ethics despite it being out of fashion in philosophical circles. In later years, he explained what he did as 'teaching people how to think for themselves', one of the most important endeavors one can do.

MG Singer served as Chairman of the UW Philosophy Department 1963–1968, during the Vietnam War Years. He served as the president of the American Philosophical Association, Central Division, from 1985 until 1986. He gave generously to support civil liberties, free thought, environmental and social justice, wildlife protection, indigenous peoples' rights, the right to clean air, water, soil, food for all, among other issues. He taught that to keep silent in the face of evil, especially that perpetrated by the culture around one, is to be complicit in that evil. His latest works focused on Evil, and a History of the UW Philosophy Department (to be published in the next year.)

== Works ==
Singer's early work describes a moral philosophy which has become known as the generalization argument. He further refines this philosophy in later works. Similar to Immanuel Kant's universalizability principle, Singer argues that if it is acceptable for one person in a particular situation to take – or not take – an action, then it is acceptable for any person in that particular situation to do the same. He further posits that an action is ethical if the results would be positive if everyone took that action and the results would not be negative if no one took that action. According to Richard Flathman, Singer's 1961 book, Generalization in Ethics – An Essay in the Logic of Ethics, with the Rudiments of a System of Moral Philosophy, was, at its publication, the "most detailed study of the topic" of generalization of the universalizability principle.

According to his profile in the Encyclopedia of Ethics, Singer's "writings also include important work on the moral philosophies of" John Stuart Mill and Henry Sidgwick. Singer's views of utilitarianism have also been noted as some of the most influential of modern ethicists.

His latest work as Emeritus Professor focused on Evil in the world. More to come from Debra Singer, who is Literary Executor of his works.

== Sources ==
- Flathman, Richard E. (1967), "Equality and Generalization: A Formal Analysis", in Pennock, J. Roland; Chapman, John W. (eds.), Equality, New York: Atherton Press, ISBN 0-202-30883-9
- Ross, Jacob Joshua (1994), The Virtues of the Family, New York: The Free Press, ISBN 0-02-927385-4
- Timmons, Mark (2001), Becker, Lawrence C.; Becker, Charlotte B. (eds.), Encyclopedia of Ethics: P–W (2 ed.), Routledge, ISBN 0-415-93673-X
