= Society for Ethical and Legal Philosophy =

Group of American analytic philosophers

The Society for Ethical and Legal Philosophy (SELF) was a group of influential American analytic philosophers dedicated to the study of ethical issues raised by the Civil rights movement and the Vietnam War. It was founded in 1967 by Thomas Nagel and Robert Nozick with encouragement from John Rawls. During the Vietnam War protests, the group met monthly in New York City and Cambridge, Massachusetts, with its membership including philosophers Michael Walzer, T. M. Scanlon, Judith Jarvis Thomson, and Gerald Dworkin, and the legal scholars Ronald Dworkin, Owen Fiss, Frank Michelman, and Charles Fried.

SELF primarily focused on reshaping political philosophy with applied ethics during the Counterculture of the 1960s, primarily by creating philosophical solutions to war, action, and moral responsibility in alignment with theories produced by Rawls and Walzer. It was particularly concerned with determining the moral limits of warfare as between moral absolutism and utilitarianism. The group was influential in the establishment of new institutions focusing on a "politicized philosophy," such as the journal Philosophy & Public Affairs. It was also highly influential in popularizing both applied ethics and practical ethics mainstream.
