= Arthur Cross =

Arthur Cross may refer to:

- Arthur Henry Cross (1884–1965), British recipient of the Victoria Cross
- Arthur Lyon Cross, American historian
- Geoffrey Cross, Baron Cross of Chelsea (Arthur Geoffrey Neale Cross, 1904–1989), British law lord
- Art Cross (1918–2005), American racecar driver
