= Connie S. Rosati =

American philosopher and academic

Connie Rosati
- Awards: Phi Beta Kappa, Phi Kappa Phi

Education
- Education: Harvard Law School (JD), University of Michigan (PhD), Michigan State University (BA)

Philosophical work
- Era: 21st-century philosophy
- Region: Western philosophy
- Institutions: University of Texas at Austin (2020-), University of Arizona (2006-2020)
- Main interests: ethics

Connie Rosati is an American philosopher and Roy Allison Vaughan Centennial Professor in Philosophy and Professor of Law at the University of Texas at Austin. Previously she was Professor of Philosophy at the University of Arizona. Rosati is known for her works on moral philosophy and was the co-editor with Julia Driver of Ethics.
