= Kurt von Fritz =

German classical philologist

Karl Albert Kurt von Fritz (25 August 1900, Metz – 16 July 1985, Feldafing) was a German classical philologist.

Appointed to a professorship for Greek at the University of Rostock in 1933, he was one of only two German professors (the other one being Karl Barth) to refuse to swear the oath of loyalty to Adolf Hitler in 1934, and was therefore dismissed in 1935. He left Germany and held posts at Corpus Christi College, Oxford, Reed College, and Columbia University. In 1954, von Fritz returned to Germany, initially to the Free University of Berlin. From 1958 until his retirement in 1968, he taught at LMU Munich.

Kurt von Fritz was a member of the Bavarian Academy of Sciences from 1959, a corresponding member of the Austrian Academy of Sciences from 1962 and a corresponding fellow of the British Academy from 1973.

Von Fritz gave the Howison Lectures in Philosophy in 1957. In 1981, he received the Sigmund Freud Prize for Academic Prose from the German Academy for Language and Literature.

== Selected Works ==
- Philosophie und sprachlicher Ausdruck bei Demokrit, Plato und Aristoteles. New York 1938.
- Pythagorean Politics in Southern Italy. An Analysis of the Sources. New York 1940.
- The theory of the Mixed Constitution in Antiquity. New York 1954.
- Antike und moderne Tragödie. Neun Abhandlungen. Berlin 1962.
- Die griechische Geschichtsschreibung. Berlin 1967.
- The Relevance of Ancient Social and Political Philosophy for our Times. A Short Introduction to the Problem. Boston/Berlin 1974.
