= William Frankena =

American moral philosopher (1908–1994)

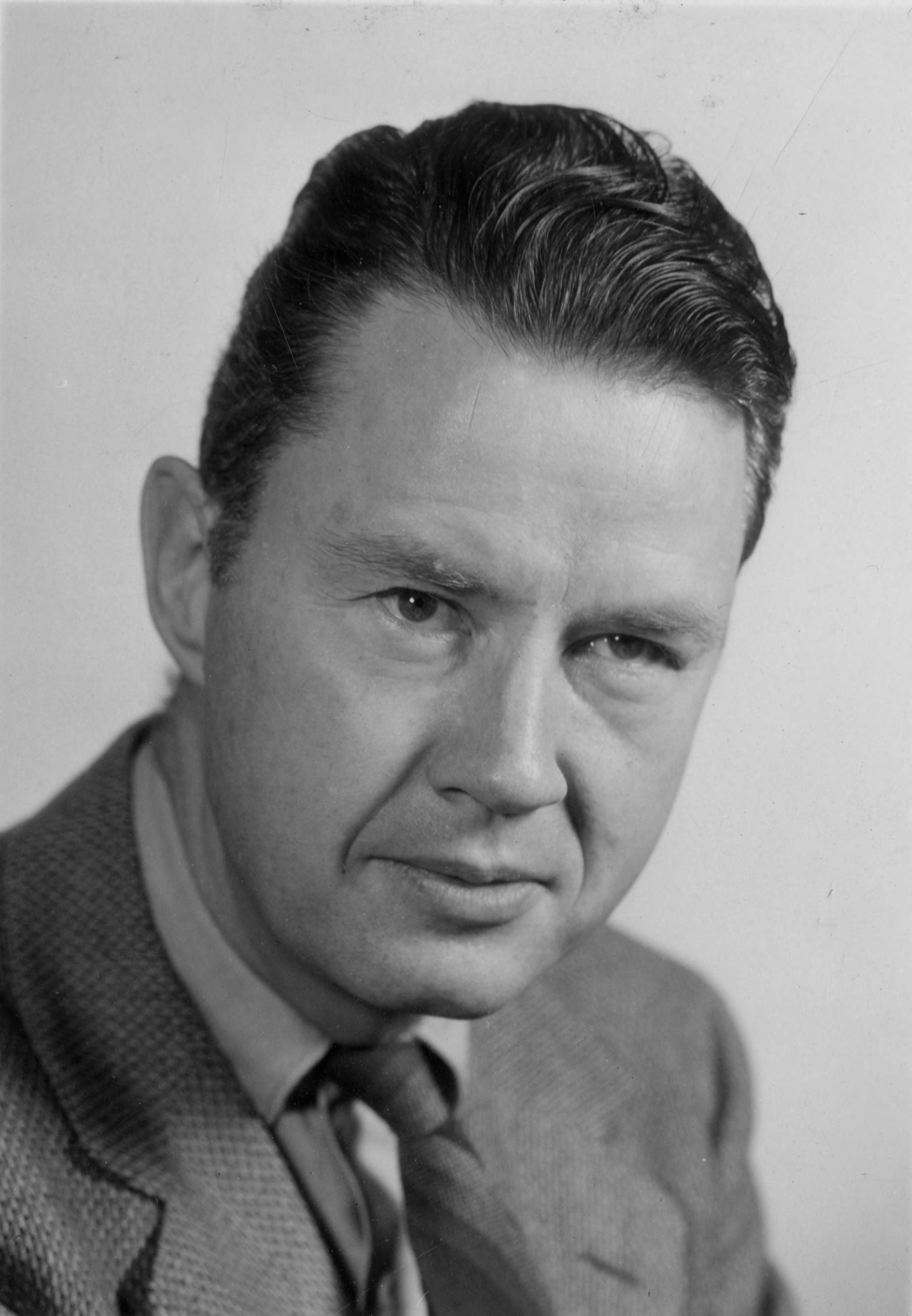
- Born: June 21, 1908; Manhattan, Montana, U.S.
- Died: October 22, 1994 (aged 86); Ann Arbor, Michigan, U.S.

Education
- Education: Calvin College (B.A.); University of Michigan (M.A.); Harvard University (Ph.D.)
- Academic advisor: Ralph Barton Perry

Philosophical work
- Era: 20th-century philosophy
- Region: Western philosophy
- School: Analytic philosophy
- Institutions: University of Michigan (1937–1978)
- Main interests: Ethics
- Notable ideas: Definist fallacy Naturalistic fallacy

William Klaas Frankena (June 21, 1908 – October 22, 1994) was an American moral philosopher. He was a member of the University of Michigan's department of philosophy for 41 years (1937–1978), and chair of the department for 14 years (1947–1961).

== Life ==
Frankena's father and mother immigrated to the U.S. as teenagers, in 1892 and 1896 respectively, from Friesland, a province in the north of the Netherlands. William Frankena was the middle one of three children. He was born in Manhattan, Montana, grew up in small Dutch communities in Montana and western Michigan, and spoke West Frisian and Dutch. In primary school, his given name, Wiebe, was Anglicized to William. Throughout his life, his family and friends called him Bill. His mother died when he was nine years old. He graduated from Holland Christian High School in Holland, MI, in 1926. After farming, his father, Nicholas A. Frankena (1875–1955), devoted the later decades of his life to elected office in Zeeland, MI, where he was mayor, and to service as an elder in the Christian Reformed Church in North America, which was founded by Calvinist Dutch immigrants.

In 1930, Frankena received a B.A. with majors in English and philosophy from Calvin College, a liberal arts college of the Christian Reformed Church. At Calvin, Frankena studied with William Harry Jellema (1893–1982). Frankena then earned an M.A. from the University of Michigan (1931), where the Department of Philosophy included C. Harold Langford (1895–1964), Dewitt H. Parker (1885–1949), and Roy Wood Sellars (1880–1973). Next Frankena earned a second M.A. and a Ph.D. (1937) at Harvard University. He studied with C. I. Lewis, Ralph Barton Perry, and Alfred North Whitehead at Harvard, and with G. E. Moore and C. D. Broad at the University of Cambridge in England while he did Ph.D. research. His doctoral dissertation, which focused on Moore's work, was entitled "Recent Intuitionism in British Ethics." Frankena became well known in the profession with his first published paper, "The Naturalistic Fallacy", Mind, 1939. During World War II, Frankena taught American history at the University of Michigan.

Frankena met his future wife, Sadie, when they were students at Calvin College. In 1928–29, Sadie was president of Calvin's forensic (oration and debate) club and editor-in-chief of Calvin's literary review, Chimes; Frankena was business manager of the club and associate editor of the review. (Prism, Calvin College, 1929) He and Sadie were married for 44 years, until Sadie's death in 1978. He was an avid birder, and is survived by two sons, four grandchildren, and four great-grandchildren.

Many Michigan undergraduates were introduced to philosophy in the popular, historically based course taught by Frankena and his close friend Paul Henle. For nearly his entire career, Frankena did most of his philosophical reading and writing at home at a desk made circa 1870. When he wrote a philosophical paper, he prepared a detailed outline, including very abbreviated versions of all points and cites, before writing the paper longhand using a mechanical pencil. He never used a typewriter or computer. Frankena greatly valued his many conversations with other moral philosophers throughout the U.S. and western Europe. William K. Frankena's philosophical papers are in the collection of the Bentley Historical Library at the University of Michigan. His philosophy books are in the collection of the Tanner Philosophy Library in Angell Hall at the University of Michigan.

== Professional service and recognition ==
While he was chair of the Michigan Philosophy Department, Frankena devoted a considerable portion of his time to service to the university and the philosophy profession, and became known for his role in defending academic freedom during the McCarthy era.

After that period, he had more time to publish books and articles. In his 1963 book Ethics, Frankena clarified various fundamental concepts in ethics and value theory. He emphasized the distinction between the good, which concerns any items that contribute positively to someone's life, and the right, which concerns the moral evaluation of actions and policies. Based on this distinction, he contrasted the ethical theories of teleology and deontology. According to teleological theories, an action is right if it produces the most good, meaning that the right is directly determined by the good. Frankena argues that deontological theories are different by asserting that some actions are inherently right, regardless of the outcomes they produce. He further explored the various meanings of the term good, the diverse types of value, and the sources of intrinsic value.

During his career Frankena was chair of the Board of Officers of the American Philosophical Association (APA), chair of the Council for Philosophical Studies, president of the APA's Western Division, a member of the American Academy of Arts and Sciences and of the National Academy of Education, and a recipient of a Guggenheim Fellowship, a Fellowship from the Center for Advanced Study in the Behavioral Sciences, a National Endowment for the Humanities Senior Fellowship, and a Rockefeller Fellowship. Frankena was also active on Phi Beta Kappa Society committees. In 1974, he delivered the APA's prestigious Paul Carus Lectures on "Three Questions about Morality." Calvin College named him a Distinguished Alumnus in 1984. Frankena received the University of Michigan's Distinguished Faculty Achievement Award, was Roy Wood Sellars Distinguished Collegiate Professor of Philosophy, and was the first College of Literature, Science, and the Arts Distinguished Senior Faculty Lecturer.

== Legacy ==
A memorial essay by a member of the Michigan Philosophy Department states that "William Frankena contributed as widely to moral philosophy and its neighboring areas as anyone in that remarkable group that dominated English-speaking ethics from the end of World War II well into the 1980s. From metaethics, the history of ethics, and normative ethical theory, to moral education, moral psychology, and applied ethics, to religious ethics and the philosophy of education, the sweep and quality of his ethical philosophizing was simply extraordinary." When Frankena retired and was awarded emeritus status in 1978, the University Regents stated that "he is renowned for his learning in the history of ethics, a subject about which he is generally believed in the profession to know more than anyone else in the world." The July 1981 issue of The Monist is devoted to "The Philosophy of William Frankena."

The university has created a chair for the "Carl G. Hempel & William K. Frankena Distinguished University Professor", and annually awards the William K. Frankena Prize for excellence in philosophy to an undergraduate student.

== Selected bibliography ==
- Ethics, 1963, 1973 (2nd ed.). In 1976, Frankena wrote that, in this book, "I finally worked out, in an elementary version, the outlines of an ethical theory, both normative and metaethical. It is still the fullest and only systematic statement there is of my moral philosophy as a whole." (K.E. Goodpaster, ed., 1976, Chapter 17.)
- Philosophy of Education, 1965.
- Three Historical Philosophies of Education: Aristotle, Kant, Dewey, 1965.
- Introductory Readings in Ethics, W.K. Frankena and J.T. Granrose, eds., 1974.
- Perspectives on Morality: Essays by William K. Frankena, K.E. Goodpaster, ed., 1976. Chapter 17, written by Frankena for this volume, is a chronological review of his thinking and writings on moral philosophy up to the mid-1970s. The volume contains a bibliography of his work through 1975.
- Three Questions about Morality, 1974 Carus Lectures, 1980.
- Thinking about Morality, 1980, is an expansion of the University of Michigan Distinguished Senior Faculty Lecture Series delivered by Frankena.

== See also ==
- American philosophy
- Analytic philosophy
- Ethics
- List of American philosophers
- List of ethicists
- List of philosophers (D–H)
- List of University of Michigan faculty and staff
