= Richard E. Flathman =

American political scientist (1934–2015)

Richard E. Flathman (August 6, 1934 – September 6, 2015) was an American political philosopher who was the George Armstrong Kelly Professor of Political Science, emeritus, at Johns Hopkins University. He is known for having pioneered, with Brian Barry, David Braybrooke, Felix Oppenheim, and Abraham Kaplan, the application of analytic philosophy to political science. He was a leading advocate of liberalism and a champion of individuality. He defended a conception of social freedom according to which it is "negative, situated, and elemental."

Flathman was born in Saint Paul, Minnesota, in 1934. He received his PhD from Berkeley in 1962. He has been a professor at Johns Hopkins since 1975, and was chair of his department from 1979 to 1985. Prior to joining Hopkins, he taught at the Universities of Washington and Chicago, and at Reed College.

With his colleague and interlocutor William E. Connolly, Flathman founded what is sometimes called the "Hopkins School" of political theory. He died on September 6, 2015, at the age of 81.

== Selected publications ==
- The Public Interest: An Essay Concerning the Normative Discourse of Politics (1966)
- "Equality and Generalization: A Formal Analysis" NOMOS IX: Equality (1967)
- Political Obligation (1972)
- The Practice of Rights (1976)
- The Practice of Political Authority: Authority and the Authoritative (1980)
- "Rights, Needs, and Liberalism" Political Theory 8 (1980)
- "Egalitarian Blood and Skeptical Turnips" Ethics 93 (1983)
- "Moderating Rights" Social Philosophy and Policy 1 (1984)
- "Culture, Morality and Rights: Or, Should Alasdair MacIntyre's Philosophical Driving License Be Suspended?" Analyse & Kritik 6, 1 (1984) (PDF)
- The Philosophy and Politics of Freedom (1987)
- "Convention, Contractarianism, and Freedom" Ethics 98 (1987)
- Toward a Liberalism (1989)
- Willful Liberalism: Voluntarism and Individuality in Political Theory and Practice (1992)
- Thomas Hobbes: Skepticism, Individuality, and Chastened Politics (1993)
- Reflections of a Would-Be Anarchist: Ideals and Institutions of Liberalism (1998)
- Freedom and Its Conditions: Discipline, Autonomy, and Resistance (2003)
- Pluralism and Liberal Democracy (2005)
- "Perfectionism without Perfection: Cavell, Montaigne, and the Conditions of Morals and Politics," in Andrew Norris (ed.) The Claim to Community: Essays on Stanley Cavell and Political Philosophy (Stanford University Press, 2006)
- "Here and Now, There and Then, Always and Everywhere: Reflections Concerning Political Theory and the Study/Writing of Political Thought," in David Armitage (ed.) British Political Thought in History, Literature, and Theory, 1500-1800 (Cambridge University Press, 2006)
- "The Philosophy and Politics of Freedom," in Freedom: A Philosophical Anthology, ed. Ian Carter, Matthew Kramer, and Hillel Steiner (Oxford: Blackwell, 2006)
- "Legitimacy," in A Companion to Contemporary Political Philosophy, Second Edition, ed. Robert Goodin, Philip Pettit, and Thomas Pogge (Blackwells, 2007)
- "Response to Critics," The Good Society 15 (3) (2006), p. 27
- "In and out of the ethical: The realist liberalism of Bernard Williams," Contemporary Political Theory 9 (1) (2010): 77-98

As editor

- Concepts in Social and Political Philosophy (1973)

== See also ==
- Thomas Hobbes
- Michel de Montaigne
- John Stuart Mill
- Wilhelm von Humboldt
- William James
- Ludwig Wittgenstein
- Michael Oakeshott
- Hannah Arendt
