= Subjective character of experience =

Psychology term

The subjective character of experience, also referred to as subjective experience, is the first-person aspect of conscious experience. Subjective experience is commonly described as encompassing sensory experiences and mental events, including perceptions, emotions, thoughts, memories, intentions, and related conscious phenomena that arise from the unique perspective of an individual. The concept is central to philosophy of mind, psychology, phenomenology, and consciousness studies, where it is used to describe the fact that conscious experiences are directly accessible only to the subject undergoing them.

Illustration of broad categories commonly used to describe subjective experience from the first-person perspective

The expression subjective character of experience was introduced by American philosopher Thomas Nagel in his influential 1974 essay "What Is It Like to Be a Bat?", in which he argued that every conscious organism has its own unique point of view. Nagel maintained that although objective scientific investigation can describe the physical and functional characteristics of an organism, it cannot fully capture what it is like for that organism to have its own experiences. His argument became a landmark in discussions concerning consciousness, reductionism, and the explanatory limits of physical accounts of the mind. Although the term originated in philosophy, the study of subjective experience has expanded considerably across several disciplines. Contemporary researchers in psychology, phenomenology, cognitive science, neuroscience, and health sciences investigate subjective experience using a variety of first-person research methods, while also examining its relationship to objective behavioural and physiological measures. As a result, subjective experience is now regarded as both a philosophical concept and an important subject of empirical investigation.

== Thomas Nagel and the origin of the concept ==
The term subjective character of experience was coined by Thomas Nagel. Nagel used this concept to refute philosophical reductionism, demonstrating that consciousness cannot be simplified solely to the physical operations of the brain and body. Nagel argues that, because bats are apparently conscious mammals with a way of perceiving their environment entirely different from that of human beings (specifically through echolocation), it is impossible for humans to truly comprehend what it is like to experience echolocation firsthand. While the example of the bat is particularly illustrative, this applies to any conscious species, as each organism has a unique point of view from which no other organism can gather experience.

== Definition ==
Subjective experience refers to the entirety of an individual's conscious life as it is experienced from the first-person perspective. It includes sensory perceptions, bodily sensations, emotions, thoughts, memories, imaginings, intentions, and other mental events that are directly available to the experiencing subject. Unlike objective descriptions, which seek to characterize mental processes from an external standpoint, subjective experience concerns how those processes are lived and experienced by the individual. The conceptual diagram below summarizes broad categories of subjective experience discussed in contemporary philosophy, psychology, and phenomenology.

Conceptual diagram illustrating subjective experience from the first-person perspective

Contemporary psychology and phenomenology generally describe subjective experience as dynamic rather than static. Experience unfolds continuously over time and is influenced by attention, memory, context, bodily states, and previous experiences. Rather than consisting of isolated mental events, subjective experience is often understood as an ongoing stream or flow in which perception, emotion, cognition, and self-awareness interact to shape an individual's lived experience.

Subjective experience is closely related to, but broader than, the philosophical concept of qualia. Qualia generally refer to the qualitative or phenomenal aspects of particular conscious experiences, such as the perceived redness of a flower or the painfulness of pain. Subjective experience, by contrast, encompasses the full range of first-person conscious phenomena, including not only sensory qualities but also emotions, thoughts, intentions, agency, memory, temporal awareness, and the organisation of experience as a whole. Consequently, many contemporary researchers regard qualia as one component of subjective experience rather than an equivalent concept.

== Relationship to consciousness ==
Subjective experience is widely regarded as a defining feature of conscious awareness. Whereas consciousness may be investigated from behavioural, cognitive, or neurobiological perspectives, subjective experience refers specifically to the way conscious states are experienced from the first-person point of view. This subjective aspect of consciousness has long been considered one of the central challenges in the philosophy of mind and cognitive science because it is directly accessible only to the individual undergoing the experience.

Research on consciousness frequently distinguishes between first-person accounts of experience and third-person investigations of observable phenomena, including behaviour and brain activity. While advances in neuroscience have identified neural correlates associated with perception, attention, emotion, and self-awareness, many researchers argue that such findings complement rather than replace descriptions of subjective experience. Consequently, understanding consciousness is often regarded as requiring both objective investigation and systematic examination of lived experience.

== First-person and third-person perspectives ==
Subjective experience is directly accessible only from the first-person perspective of the individual undergoing it, whereas third-person approaches investigate observable phenomena through behavioural observation, physiological measurement, neuroimaging, and other empirical methods. Because subjective experiences cannot be observed directly by others, scientific investigations commonly rely on participants' descriptions of their experiences together with objective measurements to study relationships between lived experience and cognitive, behavioural, or neural processes.

Contemporary research often regards first-person and third-person approaches as complementary. First-person methods seek to characterize the qualities and structure of lived experience itself, while third-person approaches investigate observable correlates and mechanisms. Rather than treating these perspectives as mutually exclusive, many interdisciplinary fields combine them to support the understanding of consciousness, cognition, and mental life. This distinction between first-person and third-person perspectives has become increasingly important in interdisciplinary research, where first-person reports are frequently integrated with third-person behavioural, physiological, and neuroscientific methods.

Conceptual comparison of first-person and third-person perspectives used in the study of subjective experience

Because subjective experience is directly accessible only from the perspective of the experiencing individual, a variety of first-person research methods have been developed to investigate it systematically. These approaches seek to obtain detailed descriptions of lived experience while minimizing assumptions, retrospective reconstruction, and theoretical interpretation. Rather than treating subjective reports as merely anecdotal, many contemporary researchers argue that carefully elicited first-person accounts can provide valuable data for psychological and cognitive scientific research.

Phenomenology has been particularly influential in the study of subjective experience. Originating in the work of Edmund Husserl and subsequently developed by philosophers including Martin Heidegger and Maurice Merleau-Ponty, phenomenology seeks to describe experience as it is lived before it is explained in terms of external theories. Contemporary phenomenological research includes both descriptive approaches, which aim to characterize experience as accurately as possible, and interpretive approaches, which examine the meanings individuals attribute to their experiences.

Several specialized methods have been developed to investigate subjective experience in empirical settings. These include Descriptive Experience Sampling, which uses randomly timed prompts to capture ongoing experience in everyday life, and micro-phenomenological interviewing, which employs structured interviews to help participants describe previously unnoticed aspects of experience in fine detail. Such methods have been applied in fields including psychology, cognitive science, meditation research, education, and health sciences.

== Relationship to neuroscience ==
Although subjective experience is inherently first-person, many researchers believe that its scientific investigation can be integrated with neuroscience. One influential approach is neurophenomenology, proposed by Francisco Varela, which combines detailed first-person reports with measurements of brain activity. Rather than treating subjective experience and neuroscience as competing perspectives, neurophenomenology seeks to examine how disciplined descriptions of experience may be correlated with neural processes.

More broadly, research in psychology and neuroscience frequently combines subjective reports with behavioural, physiological, and neuroimaging measures. Studies of perception, emotion, meditation, pain, and mental health commonly incorporate participants' descriptions of their experiences alongside objective measurements, enabling researchers to investigate relationships between lived experience and underlying cognitive and neural processes. This interdisciplinary approach reflects a recognition that first-person and third-person methods may provide complementary perspectives on conscious experience.

== Subjective experience, the present moment, and meditation practices ==
Subjective experience unfolds continuously as a changing stream of sensory experiences and mental events involving the present moment, the past, and the future. William James described this continual flow as the "stream of consciousness," emphasizing the dynamic and ever-changing character of conscious life. More detailed contemporary accounts distinguish sensory experiences that occur in the present-moment (e.g., sight, touch, smell, hearing, and taste), and happenings of the past and thoughts relating to the future, which are experienced as present-moment mental events.

Many meditation and mindfulness practices involve calming and focusing the mind, for example by attending to the breath or bodily sensations, while reducing engagement with rumination and repetitive thinking. These practices can additionally involve directing awareness to present-moment subjective experiences by observing sensations, emotions, and thoughts as they arise and pass, often with the aim of cultivating wisdom. Studies have associated mindfulness practice with increased self-awareness and psychological well-being. Clinical research has also linked mindfulness-based interventions with outcomes including reductions in stress, depression and anxiety, as well as post-traumatic growth.

== Applications ==
The study of subjective experience has applications across a wide range of disciplines, including psychology, psychiatry, neuroscience, health sciences, education, and human–computer interaction. Because many aspects of perception, emotion, cognition, and well-being can only be directly reported by the individual experiencing them, subjective experience is frequently incorporated into both qualitative and quantitative research. Self-report measures, structured interviews, phenomenological analyses, and experience sampling techniques are commonly used to investigate how individuals perceive and interpret their experiences.

In psychology, subjective experience is used to investigate processes such as perception, attention, emotion, memory, decision-making, and self-awareness. Research on topics including pain, stress, well-being, mindfulness, and emotion regulation often combines participants' descriptions of their experiences with behavioural or physiological measures. This integration enables researchers to examine relationships between first-person reports and observable cognitive or biological processes while acknowledging that subjective experience remains an essential source of information about conscious mental life.

Subjective experience also plays an important role in psychiatry and clinical psychology, where understanding an individual's lived experience contributes to the assessment and treatment of mental disorders. Clinicians frequently consider patients' descriptions of symptoms, emotions, perceptions, and changes in self-awareness alongside behavioural observations and diagnostic criteria. Phenomenological approaches have been particularly influential in the study of conditions affecting consciousness, perception, and the sense of self, including schizophrenia, depression, anxiety disorders, and dissociative disorders.

In recent decades, the study of subjective experience has expanded into interdisciplinary fields including meditation research, contemplative science, cognitive neuroscience, and health research. Investigators increasingly combine first-person descriptions with behavioural, physiological, and neuroimaging methods to examine topics such as attention, pain, emotion, consciousness, and well-being. This interdisciplinary approach reflects growing recognition that subjective experience provides information that complements objective measurements, contributing to a more comprehensive understanding of conscious experience.

== Relationship to related concepts ==
Subjective experience is closely related to several concepts in philosophy and psychology, although the terms are not synonymous. Consciousness generally refers to the state of being aware, whereas subjective experience denotes the contents and character of that awareness as lived from the first-person perspective. Similarly, qualia are commonly understood to refer to the qualitative or phenomenal aspects of particular conscious experiences, while subjective experience encompasses the broader range of perceptions, thoughts, emotions, intentions, and other mental events that constitute an individual's conscious life. In phenomenology, the term lived experience is often used to emphasize experience as it is directly encountered prior to theoretical interpretation.

== See also ==
- Dualism (philosophy of mind)
- Functionalism
- Hallucinations in the sane
- Inverted spectrum
- Mary's Room
- Multiverse
- Philosophical zombies
- Philosophy of mind
- Philosophy of perception
- Physicalism
- Pragmatism
- Qualia
- Synesthesia
- The map is not the territory
- Vertiginous question
