= Susan R. Wolf =

American philosopher (born 1952)

Susan Wolf
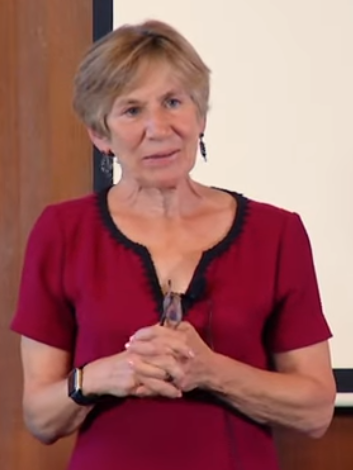
- Wolf giving the 2024 Howison Lecture
- Born: Susan Rose Wolf; 1952 (age 73–74)
- Spouse: Douglas MacLean

Academic background
- Education: Yale University; Princeton University
- Doctoral advisor: Thomas Nagel

Academic work
- Discipline: Philosophy
- Sub-discipline: Moral philosophy
- School or tradition: Analytic philosophy
- Institutions: Harvard University; University of Maryland; Johns Hopkins University; University of North Carolina, Chapel Hill
- Doctoral students: Julia Driver
- Main interests: Philosophy of action; free will
- Notable ideas: Moral saints

Susan Rose Wolf (born 1952) is an American moral philosopher and philosopher of action who is currently the Edna J. Koury Professor of Philosophy at the University of North Carolina at Chapel Hill. She taught previously at Johns Hopkins University (1986–2002), the University of Maryland (1981–1986) and Harvard University (1978–1981).

== Education and career ==
Wolf earned a BA from Yale University in philosophy and mathematics in 1974, followed in 1978, by a PhD in philosophy from Princeton University. Her thesis advisor was Thomas Nagel.

After completing her PhD, Wolf began her career teaching at Harvard University. In 1981 she moved to a position at the University of Maryland. From 1986 to 2002 she taught at Johns Hopkins University, where she became Chair of the Philosophy Department. She moved to her current role as Edna J. Koury Distinguished Professor at the University of North Carolina at Chapel Hill in 2002. Her husband, Douglas MacLean, is also a philosopher teaching at UNC-Chapel Hill. Since 2014, Wolf has served as a trustee of the National Humanities Center in Research Triangle Park, NC.

== Philosophical work ==
Wolf's work centers on the relation between freedom, morality, happiness and meaningfulness in life. Her book Freedom Within Reason (Oxford, 1990) argues for a view of free will as the ability to do what one reasonably thinks is the right thing. This allows a deterministic universe to nevertheless contain responsibility and the feeling of autonomy for us. Wolf has also written on the topic of moral luck, suggesting a reconciliation between the rationalist and irrationalist positions. She has also published influential work on the demandingness of morality. In this area her paper "Moral Saints" has been particularly influential, attacking the idea that a morally perfect person is actually an attractive ethical ideal. Along with Philippa Foot and Bernard Williams, she has challenged the overriding of morality in practical reasoning.

Wolf has also written extensively on the meaning in human life. She addresses the topic of the meaning of life in her essay "Happiness and Meaning: Two Aspects of the Good Life", in which she summaries her view as "Meaning arises when subjective attraction meets objective attractiveness… meaning arises when a subject discovers or develops an affinity for one or typically several of the more worthwhile things…". In other words, living a meaningful life consists of one's active engagement with objectively worthwhile things.

== Awards and honors ==
Wolf was elected a Fellow of the American Academy of Arts and Sciences in 1999 and of the American Philosophical Society in 2006. She received a Mellon Distinguished Achievement Award in the Humanities in 2002.

== Works (selection) ==
- The Variety of Values: Essays On Morality, Meaning, And Love, Oxford University Press, 2014; ISBN 0195332814
- Understanding Love: Philosophy, Film, And Fiction (editor with Christopher Grau), Oxford University Press, 2013; ISBN 0195384504
- Meaning in Life and Why It Matters, Princeton University Press, 2012; ISBN 9780691154503
- Freedom Within Reason, Oxford University Press, 1994; ISBN 0195085655

== See also ==
- American philosophy
- List of American philosophers
