= Samuel Burns Weston =

Samuel Burns Weston (March 10, 1855 – July 15, 1936) was an American Unitarian minister and editor.

Weston was born in Madison, Maine. He received an A.B. in 1876 from Antioch College, Yellow Springs, Ohio, and the degree of Sacrae Theologiae Baccalaureus from Harvard University in 1879. He then served as minister of the Unitarian Church in Leicester, Massachusetts until 1881. In 1885, he founded the Philadelphia Society for Ethical Culture, where he was lecturer until 1891 and director until 1934, after which was director emeritus. He was the managing editor of the society's journal, The Ethical Record, which was published 1888–1890. In 1890 he became the first editor of the International Journal of Ethics. He married Mary Hartshorne in 1891.
