= Warner Wick =

American philosopher (1911–1985)

Warner Arms Wick
- Born: 1911
- Died: 1985 (aged 73–74)

Philosophical work
- Era: Contemporary philosophy
- Region: Western philosophy
- Main interests: ethics

Warner Wick (1911 - 1985) was an American philosopher and William Rainey Harper professor of humanities at the University of Chicago. He served as the editor of Ethics. He received the Quantrell Award.

== Books ==
- Metaphysics and the New Logic, University of Chicago Press, 1942
