= Israel Scheffler =

American philosopher of science (1923–2014)

- Born: November 25, 1923; New York City, U.S.
- Died: February 16, 2014 (aged 90); Newton, Massachusetts, U.S.
- Spouse: Rosalind Zuckerbrod
- Children: 2, including Samuel

Education
- Education: Brooklyn College; Jewish Theological Seminary of America; University of Pennsylvania
- Doctoral advisor: Nelson Goodman

Philosophical work
- Era: Contemporary philosophy
- Region: Western philosophy
- School: Analytic philosophy
- Institutions: Harvard University
- Main interests: Philosophy of science Philosophy of education
- Notable ideas: Symbolic worlds

Israel Scheffler (November 25, 1923 – February 16, 2014) was an American philosopher of science and of education.

== Career ==
Scheffler held B.A. and M.A. degrees in psychology from Brooklyn College, an M.H.L. and a D.H.L. (Hon.) from the Jewish Theological Seminary of America. He defended his doctoral thesis, On Quotation, at the University of Pennsylvania in 1952, where he studied with Nelson Goodman and began teaching that year at Harvard University, where he spent his career. He retired in 1992. His main interests lay in the philosophical interpretation of language, symbolism, science and education. He was a Fellow of the American Academy of Arts and Sciences, a founding member of the National Academy of Education and a past president of both the Philosophy of Science Association and the Charles S. Peirce Society.

== Publications ==
His works have been translated from English into French, German, Italian, Spanish, Hebrew, Chinese, Japanese, Korean, and Persian.

=== Books ===
- Scheffler, Israel. The Anatomy of Inquiry: Philosophical Studies in the Theory of Science. New York: Knopf, 1963. OCLC 526705
- Scheffler, Israel. Philosophy and Education: Modern Readings. Boston: Allyn and Bacon, 1966. OCLC 397699249
- Scheffler, Israel. Science and Subjectivity. Indianapolis: Bobbs-Merrill, 1967. OCLC 374512
- Scheffler, Israel. Four Pragmatists: A Critical Introduction to Peirce, James, Mead, and Dewey. New York: Humanities Press, 1971. ISBN 978-0-391-00351-4
- Scheffler, Israel, Nelson Goodman, and Richard Rudner. Logic and Art. Indianapolis: Bobbs-Merrill Co, 1972.
- Scheffler, Israel. Reason and Teaching. Indianapolis: Bobbs-Merrill, 1973. ISBN 978-0-672-61253-4
- Scheffler, Israel. Beyond the Letter: A Philosophical Inquiry into Ambiguity, Vagueness, and Metaphor in Language. International library of philosophy and scientific method. London: Routledge & Kegan Paul, 1979. ISBN 978-0-7100-0315-7
- Scheffler, Israel. Conditions of Knowledge: An Introduction to Epistemology and Education. Chicago: University of Chicago Press, 1978, ISBN 978-0-226-73668-6
- Scheffler, Israel. The Language of Education. Springfield: Ill, 1983. ISBN 978-0-398-01656-2
- Scheffler, Israel. Of Human Potential: An Essay in the Philosophy of Education. Boston: Routledge & Kegan Paul, 1985. ISBN 978-0-7102-0571-1
- Scheffler, Israel. Inquiries: Philosophical Studies of Language, Science, & Learning. Indianapolis: Hackett Pub. Co, 1986. ISBN 978-0-87220-013-5
- Scheffler, Israel. In Praise of the Cognitive Emotions and Other Essays in the Philosophy of Education. New York: Routledge, 1991. 9780415903646 (a Collection of articles spanning 1974 to 1990.)
- Scheffler, Israel. Symbolic Worlds: Art, Science, Language, Ritual. Cambridge [England]: Cambridge University Press, 1997. ISBN 978-0-521-56425-0
- Scheffler, Israel. Worlds of Truth: A Philosophy of Knowledge. Malden, MA: Wiley-Blackwell, 2009. ISBN 978-1-4051-9170-8

=== Autobiographies ===
- Scheffler, Israel. Teachers of My Youth: An American Jewish Experience. Philosophy and education, v. 5. Dordrecht: Kluwer Academic Publishers, 1995. ISBN 978-0-7923-3232-9
- Scheffler, Israel. Gallery of Scholars: A Philosopher's Recollections. Philosophy and education, v. 13. Dordrecht: Kluwer Academic Publishers, 2004. ISBN 978-1-4020-2710-9
