= John Deigh =

American philosopher

- Born: October 6, 1953 (age 73)

Education
- Education: University of California at Los Angeles (BA, MA, PhD)

Philosophical work
- Era: 21st-century philosophy
- Region: Western philosophy
- Institutions: University of Texas at Austin
- Main interests: ethics

John Deigh (born October 6, 1953) is an American philosopher and Professor of Philosophy and Law at the University of Texas at Austin. Deigh is known for his works on ethics. During the period of 1997 to 2008, he served as the editor of Ethics.

== Books ==
- From Psychology to Morality: Essays in Ethical Naturalism, Oxford University Press, 2018,
- An Introduction to Ethics, Cambridge University Press, 2010
- Emotions, Values, and the Law, Oxford University Press, 2008
- The Sources of Moral Agency, Cambridge University Press, 1996
- The Oxford Handbook of Philosophy of Criminal Law, edited with David Dolinko, Oxford University Press, 2011
