= Mind and Cosmos =

2012 book by Thomas Nagel

Mind and Cosmos: Why the Materialist Neo-Darwinian Conception of Nature Is Almost Certainly False
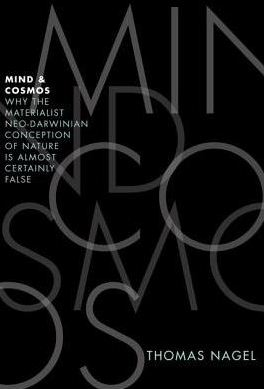
- Author: Thomas Nagel
- Language: English
- Subject: Consciousness
- Publisher: Oxford University Press
- Publication date: September 2012
- Publication place: United States
- Media type: Print
- Pages: 130
- ISBN: 978-0-19-991975-8

Mind and Cosmos: Why the Materialist Neo-Darwinian Conception of Nature Is Almost Certainly False is a 2012 book by the philosopher Thomas Nagel.

== Summary ==
In this book, Nagel argues that natural and social sciences are unable to account for the existence of mind and consciousness of man. Methodologies for inquiry about this aspect must be revised. He writes that mind is a basic aspect of nature and that any philosophy of nature that cannot account for it is fundamentally misguided. He argues that the standard naturalistic view flies in the face of common sense.

Nagel's position is that principles of an entirely different kind may account for the emergence of life, and conscious life. Consciousness could be founded by principles that are teleological, rather than materialist or mechanistic. He stresses that his argument is not a religious one (he is an atheist) and that it is not based on the theory of intelligent design (ID), though he also writes that ID proponents such as Michael Behe, Stephen C. Meyer, and David Berlinski do not deserve the scorn with which their ideas have been met by the overwhelming majority of the scientific establishment.

== Reception ==
Reviews of the book were polarized, generating significant criticism from numerous scientists and philosophers, including Steven Pinker, Daniel Dennett, and Elliott Sober. Michael Chorost wrote that Nagel raised valid criticisms but did not sufficiently engage with the large – though not dominant – body of scientific literature related to natural teleology. Chorost also suggests the book would have received less criticism had Nagel not endorsed criticisms raised by proponents of intelligent design, despite Nagel's not having endorsed intelligent design as a solution.

In an article in New Republic, Leon Wieseltier argued that Nagel was "not denounced for being wrong, but also for being heretical." Philosopher Gary Gutting noted that despite the argumentative failings of the book, Nagel developed the idea of an "atheism that is anti-materialist". Nagel’s approach was called a "refreshing change in our stale battle between science and religion." Physicist Stephen Barr echoed praise for Nagel's boldness, stating that "we ought to be grateful that Nagel has been able to see so much “more of what is so evidently the case” than most contemporary philosophers."

Nagel replied to his critics in an article in The New York Times where he summarized "the core of Mind and Cosmos", but this only drew down more criticism upon him.
