= What Is It Like to Be a Bat? =

1974 philosophy paper by Thomas Nagel

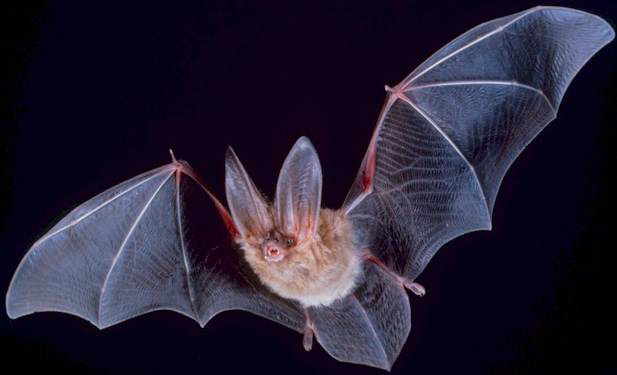
Thomas Nagel argues that while a human might be able to imagine what it is like to be a bat by taking "the bat's point of view", it would still be impossible "to know what it is like for a bat to be a bat".

"What Is It Like to Be a Bat?" is a paper by American philosopher Thomas Nagel, first published in The Philosophical Review in October 1974, and later in Nagel's Mortal Questions (1979). The paper presents several difficulties posed by phenomenal consciousness, including the potential insolubility of the mind–body problem owing to "facts beyond the reach of human concepts", the limits of objectivity and reductionism, the "phenomenological features" of subjective experience, the limits of human imagination, and what it means to be a particular, conscious thing.

Nagel asserts that "an organism has conscious mental states if and only if there is something that it is like to be that organism—something it is like for the organism." This assertion has achieved special status in consciousness studies as "the standard 'what it's like' locution". Daniel Dennett, while sharply disagreeing on some points, acknowledged Nagel's paper as "the most widely cited and influential thought experiment about consciousness".

== Thesis ==
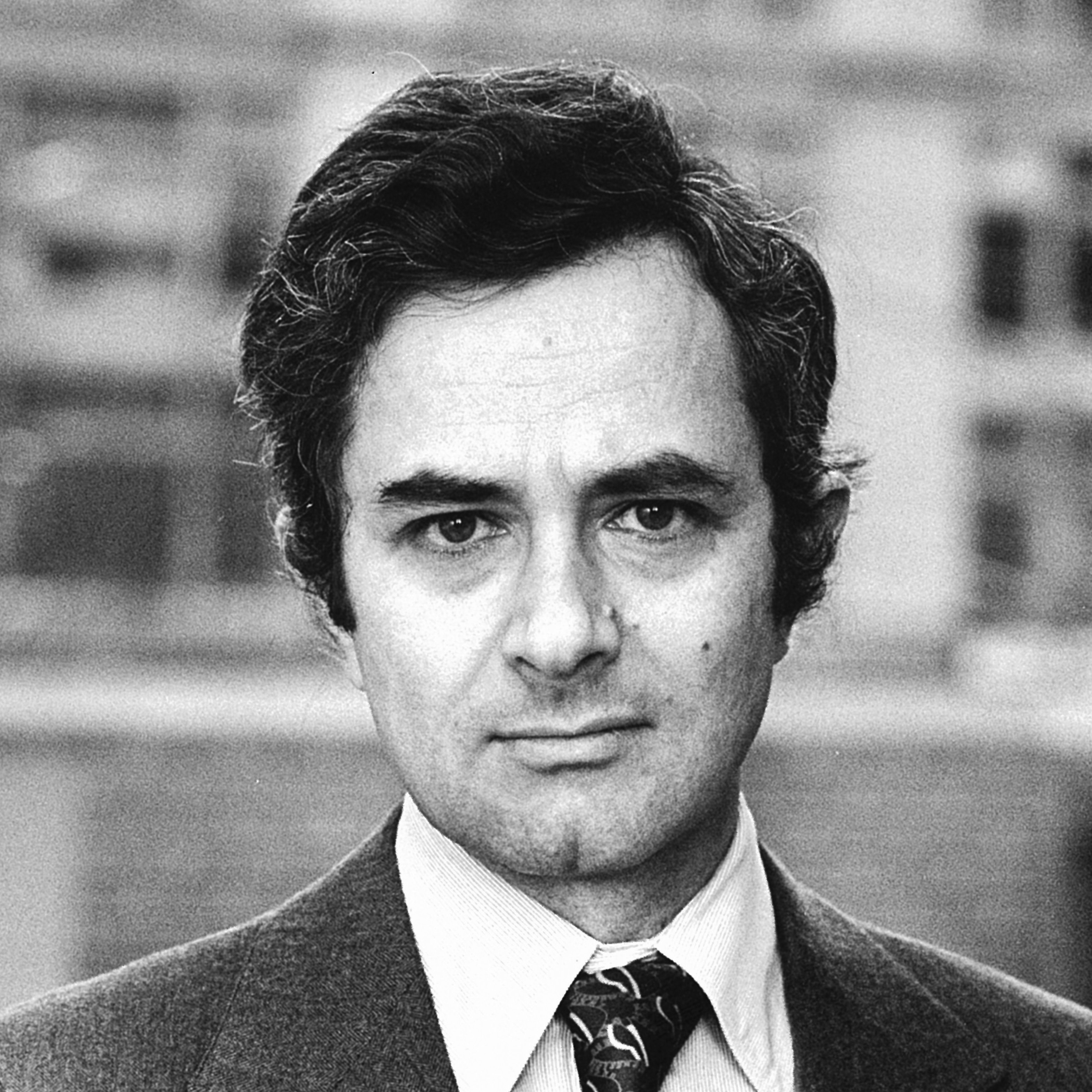
The paper's author, Thomas Nagel

Nagel challenges the possibility of explaining "the most important and characteristic feature of conscious mental phenomena" by reductive materialism (the philosophical position that all statements about the mind and mental states can be translated, without any loss or change in meaning, into statements about the physical). For example, a reductive physicalist's solution to the mind–body problem holds that whatever "consciousness" is, it can be fully described via physical processes in the brain and body.

Nagel begins by assuming that "conscious experience is a widespread phenomenon" present in many animals (particularly mammals), even though it is "difficult to say [...] what provides evidence of it". Thus, Nagel sees consciousness not as something exclusively human, but as something shared by many, if not all, organisms. Nagel must be speaking of something other than sensory perception, since objective facts and widespread evidence show that organisms with sensory organs have biological processes of sensory perception. In fact, what all organisms share, according to Nagel, is what he calls the "subjective character of experience" defined as follows: "An organism has conscious mental states if and only if there is something that it is like to be that organism – something that it is like for the organism."

The paper argues that the subjective nature of consciousness undermines any attempt to explain consciousness via objective, reductionist means. The subjective character of experience cannot be explained by a system of functional or intentional states. Consciousness cannot be fully explained if the subjective character of experience is ignored, and the subjective character of experience cannot be explained by a reductionist; it is a mental phenomenon that cannot be reduced to materialism. Thus, for consciousness to be explained from a reductionist stance, the idea of the subjective character of experience would have to be discarded, which is absurd. Neither can a physicalist view, because in such a world, each phenomenal experience had by a conscious being would have to have a physical property attributed to it, which is impossible to prove due to the subjectivity of conscious experience. Nagel argues that each and every subjective experience is connected with a "single point of view", making it infeasible to consider any conscious experience as "objective".

Nagel uses the example of bats to clarify the distinction between subjective and objective concepts. Because bats are mammals, they are assumed to have conscious experience. Nagel was inspired to use a bat for his argument after living in a home where the animals were frequent visitors. Nagel ultimately used bats for his argument because of their highly evolved and active use of a biological sensory apparatus that is significantly different from that of many other organisms. Bats use echolocation to navigate and perceive objects. This method of perception is similar to the human sense of vision. Both sonar and vision are regarded as perceptual experiences. While it is possible to imagine what it would be like to fly, navigate by sonar, hang upside down and eat insects like a bat, that is not the same as a bat's perspective. Nagel claims that even if humans were able to metamorphose gradually into bats, their brains would not have been wired as a bat's from birth; therefore, they would only be able to experience the life and behaviors of a bat, rather than the mindset.

Such is the difference between subjective and objective points of view. According to Nagel, "our own mental activity is the only unquestionable fact of our experience", meaning that each individual only knows what it is like to be them (subjectivism). Objectivity requires an unbiased, non-subjective state of perception. For Nagel, the objective perspective is not feasible, because humans are limited to subjective experience.

Nagel concludes with the contention that it would be wrong to assume that physicalism is incorrect, since that position is also imperfectly understood. Physicalism claims that states and events are physical, but those physical states and events are only imperfectly characterized. Nevertheless, he holds that physicalism cannot be understood without characterizing objective and subjective experience. That is a necessary precondition for understanding the mind–body problem.

== Criticisms ==
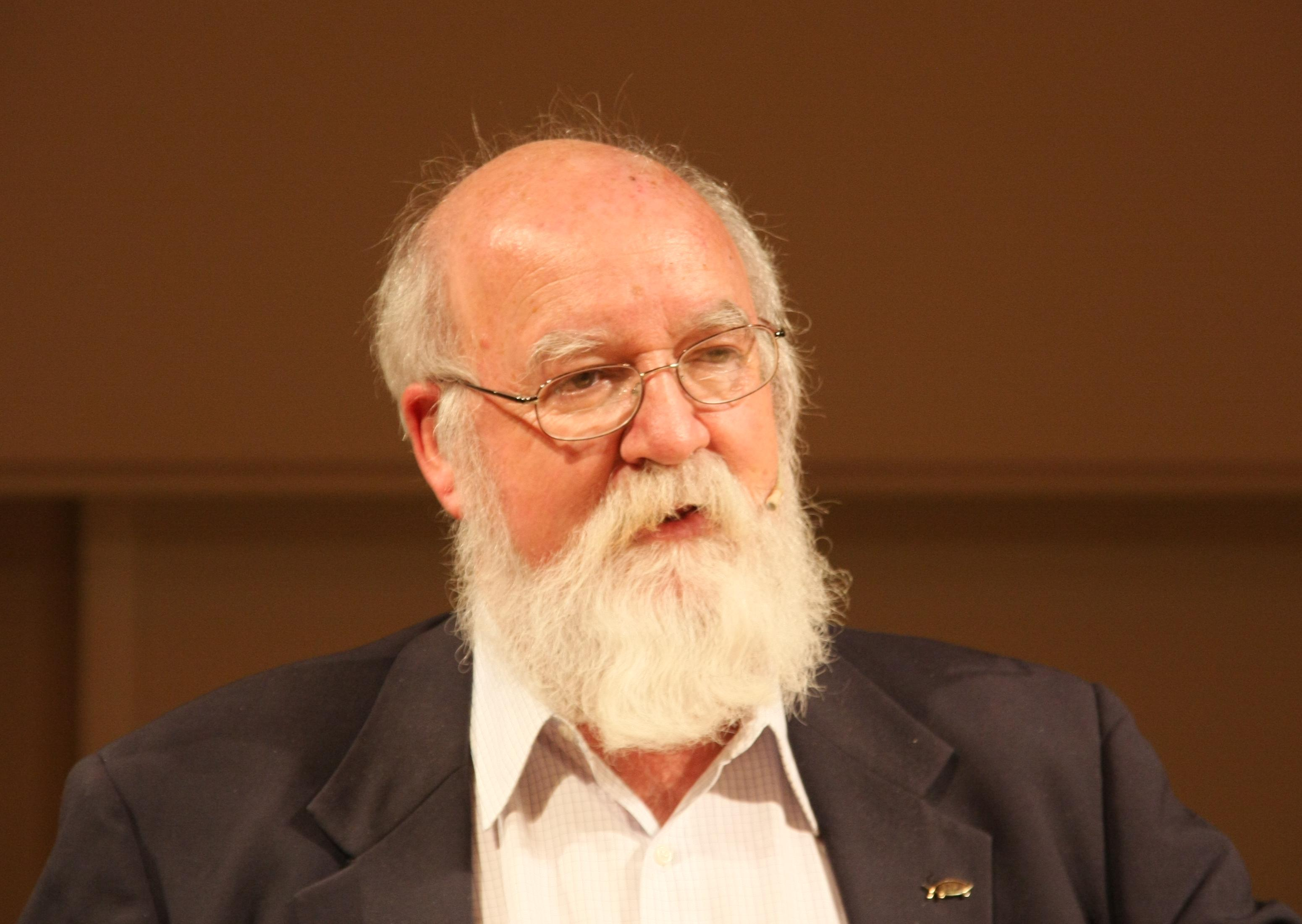
Daniel Dennett has been a vocal critic of the paper's assertions.

Daniel Dennett denied Nagel's claim that the bat's consciousness is inaccessible, contending that any "interesting or theoretically important" features of a bat's consciousness would be amenable to third-person observation. For instance, it is clear that bats cannot detect objects more than a few meters away because echolocation has a limited range. Dennett holds that any similar aspects of its experiences could be gleaned by further scientific experiments. He has also pointed out that Nagel's argument and question were not new, but had previously been stated by B. A. Farrell in his 1950 article "Experience", published in the journal Mind.

Kathleen Akins similarly argued that many questions about a bat's subjective experience hinge on unanswered questions about the neuroscientific details of a bat's brain (such as the function of cortical activity profiles), and Nagel is too quick in ruling these out as answers to his central question.

Peter Hacker analyzes Nagel's statement as not only "malconstructed" but philosophically "misconceived" as a definition of consciousness, and he asserts that Nagel's paper "laid the groundwork for ... forty years of fresh confusion about consciousness".

Eric Schwitzgebel and Michael S. Gordon have argued that, contrary to Nagel, normal sighted humans do use echolocation much like bats – it is just that it is generally done without one's awareness. They use this to argue that normal people in normal circumstances can be grossly and systematically mistaken about their conscious experience.

== See also ==
- Umwelt
- Animal consciousness
- Intersubjectivity
- Qualia
