= Samuel Scheffler =

American philosopher (born 1951)

- Born: Samuel Ira Scheffler; 1951 (age 74–75)
- Father: Israel Scheffler

Education
- Education: Harvard University (BA, 1973); Princeton University (PhD, 1977)
- Thesis: Agents and Outcomes (1977)
- Doctoral advisor: Thomas Nagel

Philosophical work
- Era: Contemporary philosophy
- Region: Western philosophy
- School: Analytic philosophy
- Institutions: University of California, Berkeley; New York University
- Doctoral students: Agnes Callard
- Main interests: Moral philosophy; Political philosophy; Value theory
- Notable ideas: Agent-centred prerogatives; Distributive hybrid theory

Samuel Ira Scheffler (born 1951) is an American moral and political philosopher, who is University Professor of Philosophy and Law in the Department of Philosophy and the School of Law at New York University (NYU). He is the son of the Harvard philosopher Israel Scheffler.

== Education and career ==
Before moving to NYU in 2008, Scheffler taught for 31 years at the University of California, Berkeley. Scheffler received his PhD from Princeton University, where he was a student of the philosopher Thomas Nagel. He was elected a fellow of the American Academy of Arts and Sciences in 2004.

He is a member of the Norwegian Academy of Science and Letters.

== Philosophical work ==
Scheffler's book, Death and the Afterlife, based on his Tanner Lectures at University of California, Berkeley, has generated considerable attention for its argument that much that we value in life depends on the assumption that life will continue long after our death. As the Princeton philosopher Mark Johnston explained in Boston Review:

In Scheffler's self-consciously idiosyncratic use of the term, the "afterlife" is neither a supernatural continuation of this life, nor the result of a deeper naturalistic understanding of the kind of thing we are; it is what John Stuart Mill called "the onward rush of mankind," the collective life of humanity after our individual deaths. Scheffler's thesis is that the onward rush of humankind – the collective afterlife – is much more important to us than we are ordinarily apt to notice.

Assessing the argument, the English philosopher John Cottingham wrote: "Scheffler has produced a superb essay – indeed it seems to me about as good as analytic philosophy gets. It is entirely free from obfuscating jargon and other tiresome tricks of the trade, yet it is meticulously argued and demanding in exactly the right way – forcing us to think about hitherto unexamined implications of our existing beliefs."

== Selected books ==
- One Life to Lead: The Mysteries of Time and the Goods of Attachment (Oxford University Press, 2025)
- Why Worry About Future Generations (Oxford University Press, 2018)
- Death and the Afterlife (Oxford University Press, 2013)
- Equality and Tradition (Oxford University Press, 2010)
- Boundaries and Allegiances: Problems of Justice and Responsibility in Liberal Thought (Oxford University Press, 2001)
- The Rejection of Consequentialism (Oxford University Press 2nd ed., 1994) (editor)
- Human Morality (Oxford University Press, 1992)
