= Walter Goodnow Everett =

American philosopher (1860–1937)

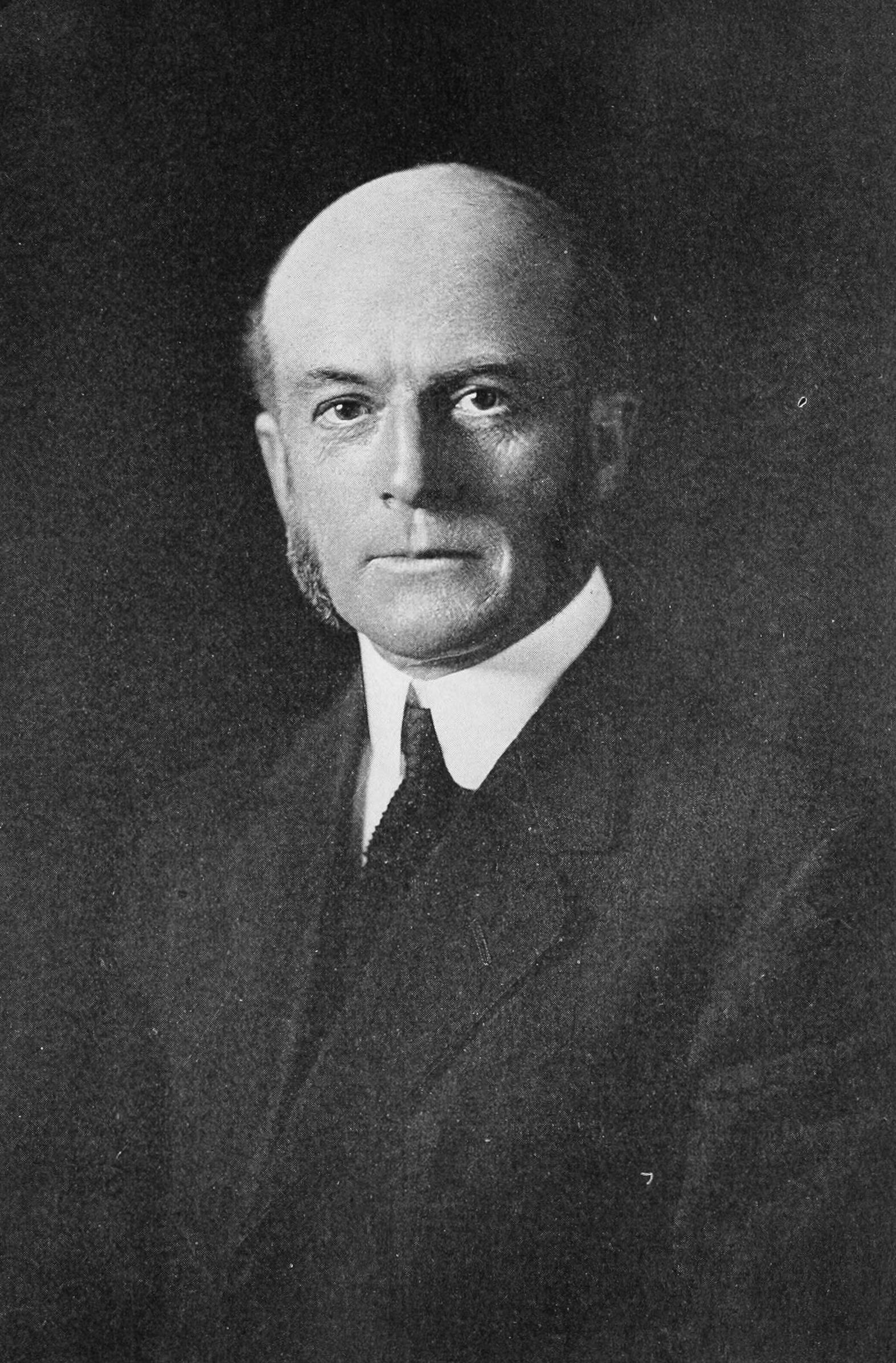
- Born: August 21, 1860; Rowe, Massachusetts

Walter Goodnow Everett (August 21, 1860 – July 29, 1937) was a professor of Latin, philosophy, and natural theology from 1890 to 1930 at Brown University.

== Life ==
Walter Goodnow Everett was born on August 21, 1860, in Rowe, Massachusetts to Samuel and Alcesta (née Goodnow) Everett. He attended Brown, receiving his A.B. in 1885, his A.M. in 1888, and his Ph.D. in 1895. In 1895 and 1896, he studied at the Universities of Berlin and Strasbourg.

Everett served as head of the philosophy department at Brown from 1896 to 1930, and as acting university president while President William H. P. Faunce made a trip around the world in 1912–13

His daughter Helen (1892–1982) married Alexander Meiklejohn and collaborated with him on writing projects.

Everett died in Berkeley, California on July 29, 1937.

Everett House, a freshman hall on campus, was named after him.

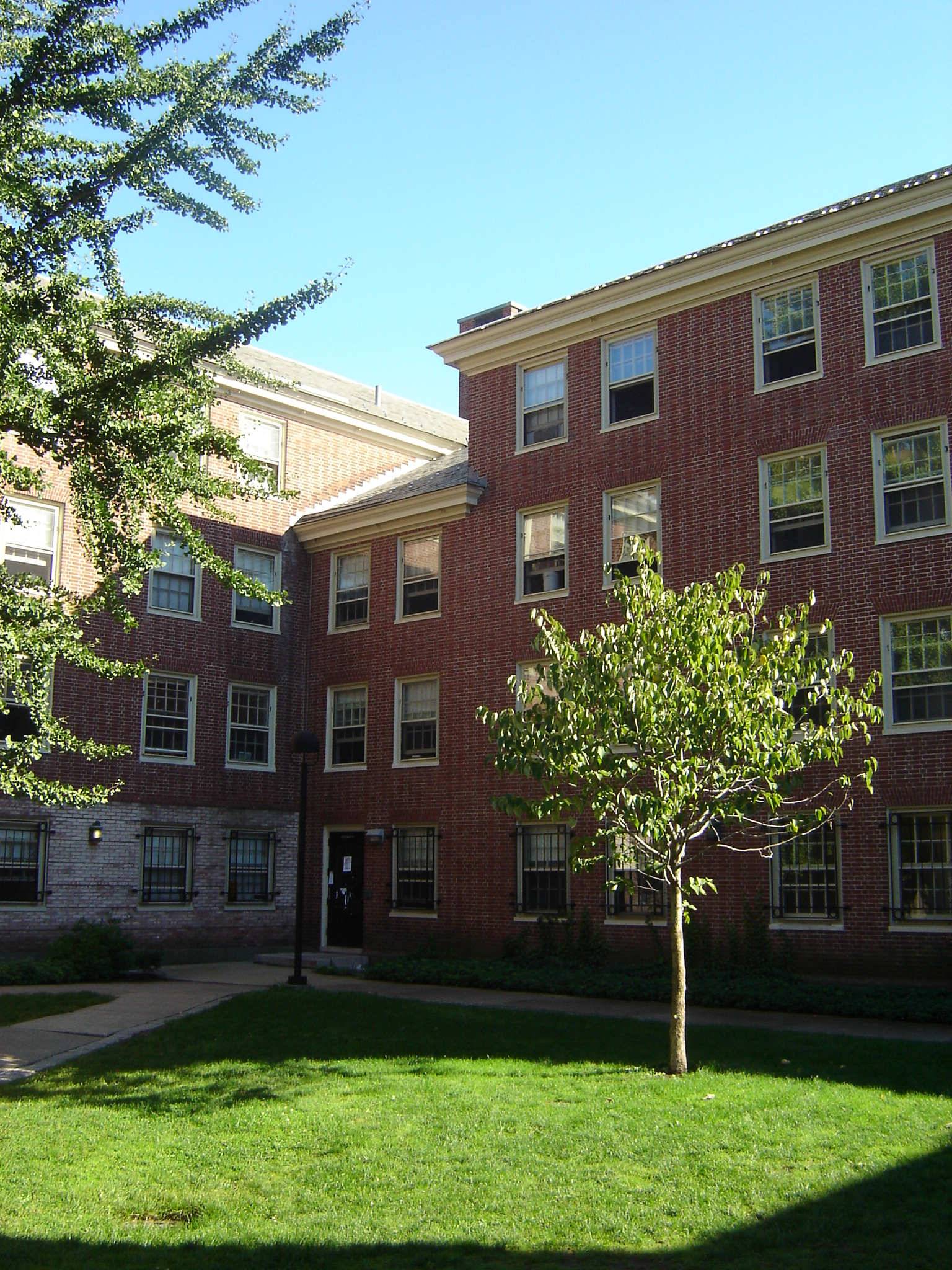
Everett House at Brown University

== Writings ==
- (1923) The Problem of Progress Philosophical Review 32 (2):125-153.
- (1918) Moral Values: A Study of the Principles of Conduct.
- (1900) The Relation of Ethics to Religion, International Journal of Ethics 10 (4):479-493.
