= Robert Mark Wenley =

Scottish academic (1861–1929)

Professor Robert Mark Wenley FRSE
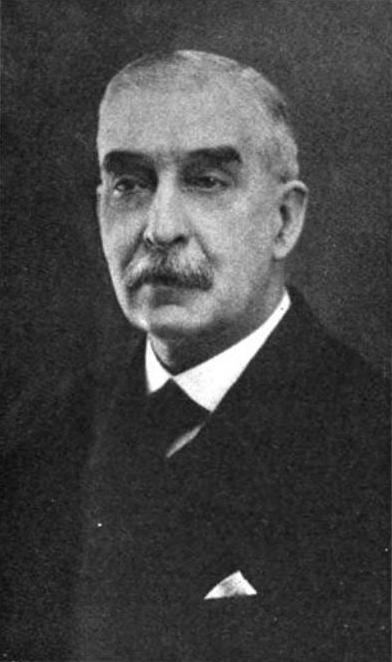
- Wenley, c. 1925

Professor of Philosophy, University of Michigan
- In office 1896 – 29 March 1929

Personal details
- Born: 19 July 1861 Edinburgh, Scotland
- Died: 29 March 1929 (aged 67) Ann Arbor, Michigan, United States
- Occupation: Philosopher

Robert Mark Wenley (19 July 1861 – 29 March 1929) was a Scottish philosopher.

== Life ==
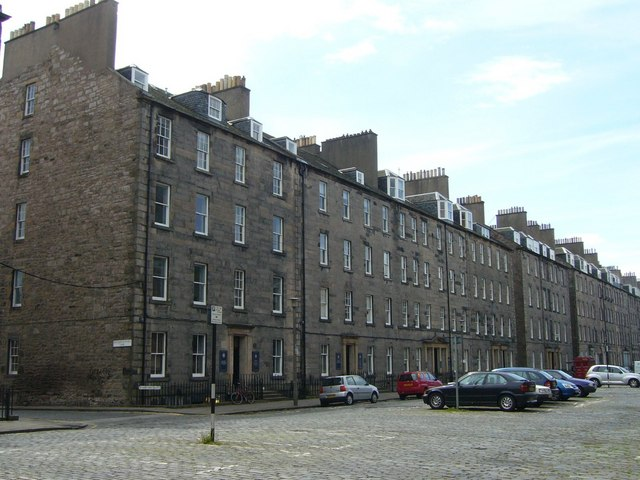
Buccleuch Place, Edinburgh

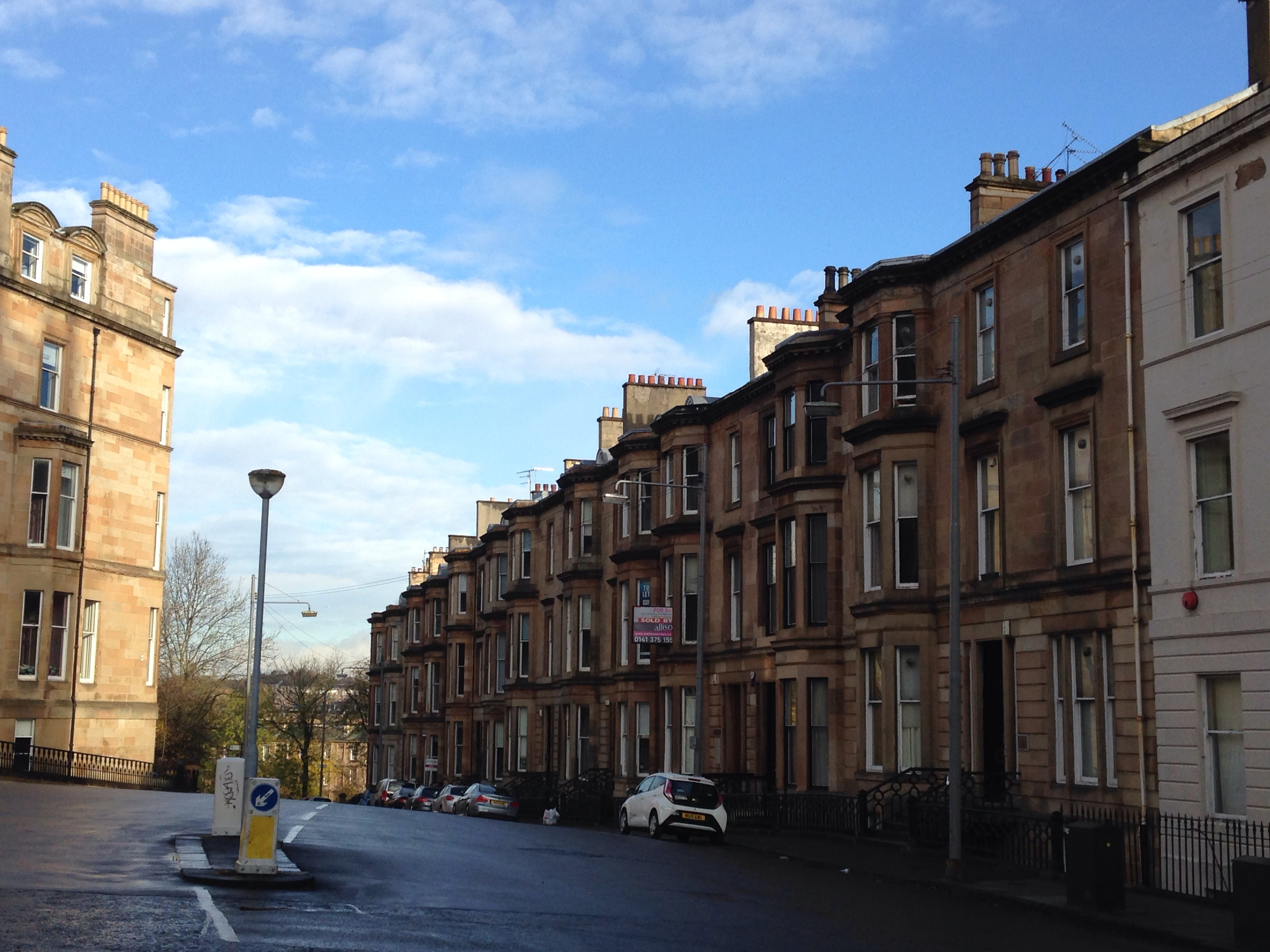
Lynedoch Place, Glasgow

He was born in Edinburgh on 19 July 1861 the son of Jemima Isabella Veitch and her husband, James Adams Wenley FRSE (1841-1902), Treasurer of the Bank of Scotland. The family lived at 4 Buccleuch Place, just south of George Square, Edinburgh.

In 1869 his father obtained a senior position as Bank Manager in Glasgow and the family relocated to 8 Lynedoch Place, a then-new, mid-terraced townhouse in the Kelvingrove district. He was educated at Park school and Glasgow High School.

He studied philosophy at the University of Glasgow under Prof John Veitch, his mother's cousin, and under Edward and John Caird. He graduated with an MA in 1884. He was a Fellow at the University until 1888 then went to the University of Edinburgh to gain a doctorate (DSc) in 1891. From 1888 he was also lecturing in logic and moral philosophy at Queen Margaret College, Glasgow.

In 1896 he was elected a Fellow of the Royal Society of Edinburgh. His proposers were Simon Somerville Laurie, Henry Calderwood, Alexander Crum Brown, and Alexander Buchan.

In 1896 he accepted a post as Professor of Philosophy at the University of Michigan.

He died on 29 March 1929 at Ann Arbor in Michigan.

== Family ==
He married Catherine Dickson Gibson in Glasgow in 1891, and together they had five children. In America he stated that his marriage was in 1889 to disguise the illegitimate birth of their first child in 1890.

== Publications ==
- Socrates and Christ (1889)
- Monism and Dualism (1895) with Veitch
- Aspects of Pessimism (1897)
- Kant's Critique of Pure Reason (1897)
- The Preparation of Christianity in the Ancient World (1898)
- Kant and His Philosophical Revolution (1910)
- The Anarchist Ideal
- The Life of Robert Flint
- The Life and Work of George Sylvester Morris
- Stoicism and its Influence
- The Poetry of John Davidson
- Contemporary Theology and Theism
- The University Extension Programme in Scotland
- John Dalton: The Founder of Modern Atomic Theory
- Marian Evans and George Eliot
