= James Hayden Tufts =

American philosopher

James Hayden Tufts (1862– August 5, 1942), an influential American philosopher, was a professor of the then newly founded Chicago University. Tufts was also a member of the Board of Arbitration, and the chairman of a committee of the social agencies of Chicago. The work Ethics in 1908 (with a second edition appearing in 1932) was a collaboration of Tufts and John Dewey. Tufts believed in a conception of mutual influences which he saw as opposed in both Marxism and idealism.

Tufts was born in Monson Massachusetts and attended his father's school. He was an 1884 graduate of Amherst College; received a B.D. from Yale University in 1889 (where he won the John Addison Porter Prize), an M.A. from Amherst College in 1890, and his Ph.D. from the University of Freiburg under Alois Riehl in 1892. With John Dewey and George Herbert Mead (both of whom Tufts was instrumental in bringing to the University), Tufts was a co-founder of the Chicago School of Pragmatism. Tufts was a longstanding chairman of the Department of Philosophy and at one time was the acting president of Chicago University.

Tufts sat on the editorial committee of The American Journal of Theology in 1918, 1919, and 1920. He edited the journal Ethics from October 1914 through 1931.

== Selected works ==
=== Books ===
- Tufts, James Hayden, ed. (1902). James Tufts: A Memorial. Chicago: University of Chicago Press – via Internet Archive.
- Dewey, John; Tufts, James H. (1908). Ethics. New York: Henry Holt and Company – via Internet Archive.
- Tufts, James Hayden (1917). "The Moral Life and the Construction of Values and Standards". Creative Intelligence: Essays in the Pragmatic Attitude. New York: Henry Holt and Company. pp. 354–408 – via Internet Archive.
- Tufts, James Hayden (1933). America's Social Morality: Dilemmas of the Changing Mores. New York: Henry Holt and Company – via Internet Archive.

=== Articles ===
- Tufts, James Hayden (April 1908). "The Adjustment of the Church to the Psychological Conditions of the Present". The American Journal of Theology. 12 (2): 177–188. doi:10.1086/478744. JSTOR 3155126.
- Tufts, James Hayden; Lyman, Eugene W.; Sneath, E. Hershey (January 1910). "The Ultimate Test of Religious Truth: Is It Historical or Philosophical?". The American Journal of Theology. 14 (1): 16–46. doi:10.1086/478894. JSTOR 3154901.
- Tufts, James Hayden (April 1912). "Recent Discussions of Moral Evolution". Harvard Theological Review. 5 (2): 155–179. doi:10.1017/S0017816000013444. JSTOR 1507425.
- Tufts, James Hayden (January 1916). "The Ethics of the Family". International Journal of Ethics. 26 (2): 223–240. doi:10.1086/intejethi.26.2.2376622. JSTOR 2376622.
- Tufts, James Hayden (September 1926). "A University Chapel". The Journal of Religion. 6 (5): 449–456. doi:10.1086/480603. JSTOR 1195286.
- Tufts, James Hayden (September 1933). "A Social Philosopher's Idea of Good Government". The Annals of the American Academy of Political and Social Science. 169 (The Crisis of Democracy): 193–201. doi:10.1177/000271623316900121. JSTOR 1017769.
- Tufts, James Hayden (March 1935). "The Institution as Agency of Stability and Readjustment in Ethics". The Philosophical Review. 44 (2): 138–153. doi:10.2307/2179852. JSTOR 2179852.
- Tufts, James Hayden (April 1936). "Liberal Movements in the United States--Their Methods and Aims". International Journal of Ethics. 46 (3): 253–275. doi:10.1086/intejethi.46.3.2989265. JSTOR 2989265.
