= Ethics (journal) =

Ethics: An International Journal of Social, Political, and Legal Philosophy
- Discipline: Ethics, moral philosophy, philosophy of law, political philosophy
- Language: English
- Edited by: Douglas W. Portmore

Publication details
- Former name: International Journal of Ethics
- History: 1890–present
- Publisher: University of Chicago Press (United States)
- Frequency: Quarterly
- Impact factor: 1.892 (2019)

Standard abbreviations
- ISO 4: Ethics

Indexing
- ISSN: 0014-1704 (print); 1539-297X (web)
- JSTOR: 00141704
- OCLC no.: 42799275

Links
- Journal homepage; Online archive

Ethics: An International Journal of Social, Political, and Legal Philosophy is a peer-reviewed academic journal established in 1890 as the International Journal of Ethics, renamed in 1938, and published since 1923 by the University of Chicago Press. The journal covers scholarly work in moral, political, and legal philosophy from a variety of intellectual perspectives, including social and political theory, law, and economics. It publishes both theory and application of theory to contemporary moral issues, as well as historical essays, provided they have significant implications for contemporary theory. The journal also publishes review essays, discussion articles, and book reviews. The journal employs a triple-blind peer review process.

According to the Journal Citation Reports, the journal has a 2019 impact factor of 1.892.

== History ==
Ethics is the direct continuation of the International Journal of Ethics, established in October 1890. Its first volume included contributions by many leading moral philosophers, including the pragmatists John Dewey and William James, idealists Bernard Bosanquet, and Josiah Royce, and the utilitarian Henry Sidgwick. The journal was established by the leaders of the humanist Ethical Movement, most notably Felix Adler, who was involved in the American Ethical Union, but also his humanist counterparts in the British Ethical Union such as Stanton Coit, John Stuart Mackenzie, and J.H. Muirhead, as part of an editorial board which also featured philosophers from Paris, Berlin, and Prague. The journal's first editor was S. Burns Weston, who assembled an international editorial committee.

From its first issue in October, 1890 the journal published articles on ethics, discussions, and book reviews. It also served another function, which was to report on the activities of ethical culture societies around the world. Examples include the 1891 "book review" summarizing the annual report of the Workingman's School that was being operated by the New York Ethical Society and Jane Addams's 1898 report and commentary on her reformist social work at Hull House in Chicago.

In 1914, James Hayden Tufts became the editor of the journal, and brought on John Dewey as an associate editor. Under his leadership, the journal gradually shifted away from the Ethical Culture Movement and became a leading journal of philosophy. It was sold to the University of Chicago Press in 1923.

Thomas Vernor Smith became editor of the journal in 1932, and brought on a number of new members to the editorial committee, including Herbert James Paton, Ralph Barton Perry, and W.D. Ross.

Under the leadership of Brian Barry in 1979, the journal became more interdisciplinary and once again quite international, and the editorial board grew to fifty-two members. Editor Gerald Dworkin instituted a double-blind review process in 1991. In 2017, the then editor, Henry S. Richardson, removed the remaining qualifications resulting in a review process in which none of the editors learn the authors' names until after the final decision has been reached on their submission. In 2018, Julia L Driver and Connie S. Rosati became co-editors of the journal, the first women to do so in its history. In 2024, Douglas W. Portmore became the current Editor of ETHICS.

== Editors ==
- S. Burns Weston (founding editor)
- Frank Thilly (co-editor with Weston)
- James Hayden Tufts
- Thomas Vernor Smith
- Charner Marquis Perry
- Charles Wegener
- Warner Wick
- Brian Barry
- Gerald Dworkin
- John Deigh (1997–2008)
- Henry S. Richardson (2008–2018)
- Julia L Driver and Connie S. Rosati (2018–2023)
- Douglas W. Portmore (2024-)

== Notable articles ==
- Cohen, Joshua (October 1986). "An Epistemic Conception of Democracy". Ethics. 97 (1): 26–38. doi:10.1086/292815. JSTOR 2381404. S2CID 143727410.
- Young, Iris (January 1989). "Polity and Group Difference: A Critique of the Ideal of Universal Citizenship". Ethics. 99 (2): 250–274. doi:10.1086/293065. JSTOR 2381434. S2CID 54215809.
- Kymlicka, Will (July 1989). "Liberal Individualism and Liberal Neutrality". Ethics. 99 (4): 883–905. doi:10.1086/293125. JSTOR 2381238. S2CID 143501657.
- Buchanan, Allen (October 1992). "Assessing the Communitarian Critique of Liberalism". Ethics. 99 (4): 48–75. JSTOR 2381237.
- Pogge, Thomas (October 1992). "Cosmopolitanism and Sovereignty". Ethics. 97 (1): 48–75. doi:10.1086/293470. hdl:1885/30478. JSTOR 2381495. S2CID 143951313.
- Miller, David (April 1992). "Distributive Justice: What the People Think". Ethics. 102 (3): 555–593. doi:10.1086/293425. JSTOR 2381840. S2CID 144567039.
- Galston, William (October 1986). "Two Concepts of Liberalism". Ethics. 105 (3): 516–534. doi:10.1086/293725. JSTOR 2382140. S2CID 222814373.
- Jones, Katen (October 1986). "Trust as an Affective Attitude". Ethics. 107 (1): 4–25. doi:10.1086/233694. JSTOR 2382241. S2CID 144929560.
- Stilz, Anna (April 2011). "Nations, States, and Territories". Ethics. 121 (3): 572–601. doi:10.1086/658937. S2CID 144410621.
- Barnes, Elizabeth (October 2014). "Valuing Disability, Causing Disability". Ethics. 125: 88–113. doi:10.1086/677021. S2CID 170520002.
- Jenkins, Katharine (January 2016). "Amelioration and Inclusion: Gender Identity and the Concept of Woman". Ethics. 126 (2): 394–421. doi:10.1086/683535. S2CID 147699916.

== See also ==
- List of ethics journals
- List of philosophy journals
