= Thomas Nagel =

American philosopher (born 1937)

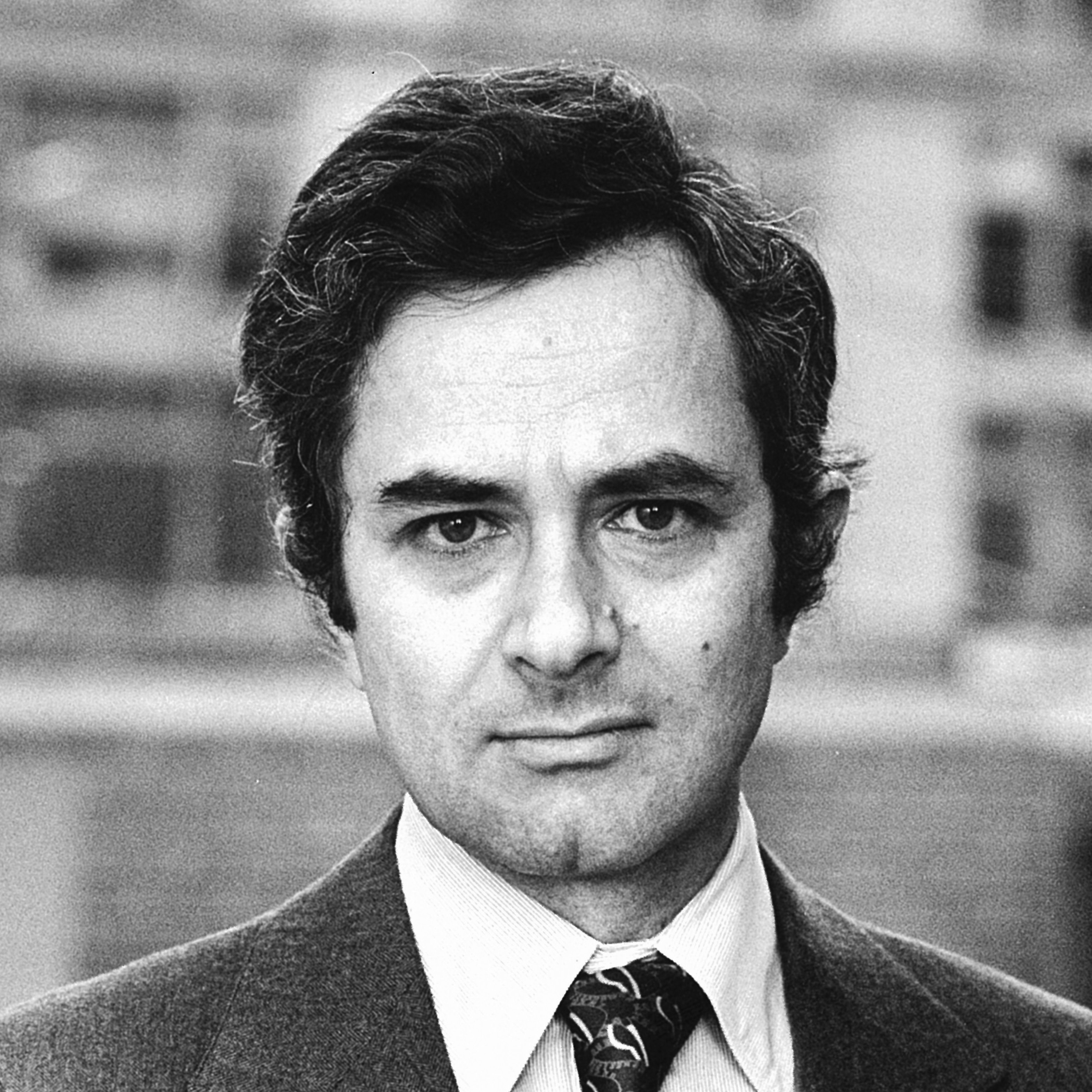
- Nagel in 1978
- Born: July 4, 1937 (age 89); Belgrade, Yugoslavia (now Serbia)
- Spouses: Doris G. Blum (m. 1954; div. 1973); Anne Hollander (m. 1979; died 2014); Susan Chace (m. 2022)
- Awards: Balzan Prize (2008); Rolf Schock Prize (2008); Nicholas Rescher Prize for Systematic Philosophy (2021); Berggruen Prize for Philosophy and Culture (2026)

Education
- Education: Cornell University (BA); Corpus Christi College, Oxford (BPhil); Harvard University (PhD)
- Thesis: Altruism (1963)
- Doctoral advisor: John Rawls
- Other advisor: J. L. Austin

Philosophical work
- Region: Western philosophy
- School: Analytic
- Institutions: New York University; Princeton University; University of California, Berkeley
- Doctoral students: Marcelo Alegre; Rebecca Goldstein; Shelly Kagan; Samuel Scheffler; Susan Wolf
- Main interests: Epistemology; ethics; legal philosophy; philosophy of mind; political philosophy
- Notable works: "What Is It Like to Be a Bat?" (1974); The View from Nowhere (1986); Mind and Cosmos (2012)
- Notable ideas: Panpsychism; subjective character of experience

Thomas Nagel (/ˈneɪɡəl/; born July 4, 1937) is an American philosopher. He is a professor of philosophy, a professor of law, and University Professor of Philosophy and Law Emeritus at New York University. From 2001 to 2003, he was the Fiorello LaGuardia Professor of Law at the New York University School of Law. His main areas of philosophical interest are political philosophy, ethics, and philosophy of mind.

After earning his doctorate from Harvard University under John Rawls, Nagel was a professor of philosophy at the University of California, Berkeley, from 1963 to 1966 and a professor at Princeton University from 1966 to 1980. In 1967, he and Robert Nozick co-founded an influential group of philosophers known as the Society for Ethical and Legal Philosophy. In the 1970s, Nagel also co-founded the philosophy journal Philosophy & Public Affairs.

Nagel is known for his critique of material reductionist accounts of the mind, particularly in his essay "What Is It Like to Be a Bat?" (1974), and for his contributions to liberal moral and political theory in The Possibility of Altruism (1970) and subsequent writings. He continued the critique of reductionism in Mind and Cosmos (2012), in which he argues against the neo-Darwinian view of the emergence of consciousness.

== Early life and education ==
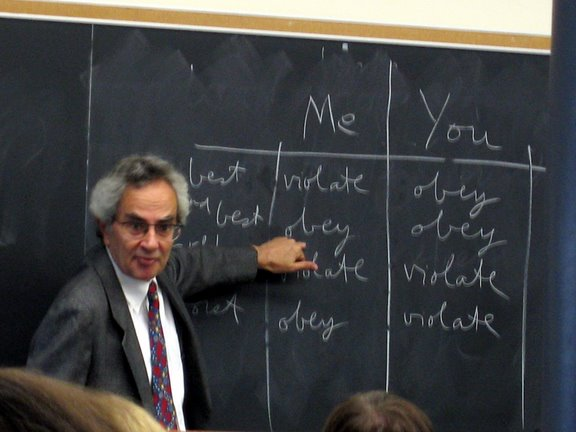
Nagel in 2008, teaching ethics

Nagel was born on July 4, 1937, in Belgrade, Yugoslavia. His parents, Carolyn (née Baer) and Walter Nagel, were German Jewish refugees. He arrived in the U.S. in 1939 and was raised secular in New York City, but identifies as Jewish. He became a naturalized U.S. citizen in 1944.

Nagel graduated from Cornell University with a Bachelor of Arts in philosophy in 1958. As an undergraduate, he studied under the philosophers Norman Malcolm, Rogers Albritton, and John Rawls. He initially intended to major in physics, but, after developing an interest in philosophy, switched. After graduation, he won a Fulbright Scholarship to attend the University of Oxford, where he earned a Bachelor of Philosophy from Corpus Christi College in 1960. There he studied under Paul Grice, Peter Strawson, H. L. A. Hart, G. E. M. Anscombe, G. E. L. Owen, Philippa Foot, and James Thomson. He was also one of the last students of J. L. Austin, who served as the advisor of his BPhil thesis.

In 1963, Nagel earned his PhD in philosophy from Harvard University, where he completed his dissertation under Rawls, who had moved from Cornell to Harvard. His professors at Harvard also included Willard Van Orman Quine and Noam Chomsky. He later called Rawls "the most important political philosopher of the twentieth century." As a doctoral student at Harvard, Nagel edited early drafts of Rawls's A Theory of Justice and befriended Gilbert Harman and Saul Kripke. His doctoral thesis was titled "Altruism".

== Academic career ==
Nagel taught at the University of California, Berkeley (from 1963 to 1966) and at Princeton University (from 1966 to 1980), where he trained many well-known philosophers, including Susan Wolf, Shelly Kagan, and Samuel Scheffler, the last of whom is now his colleague at New York University.

Nagel is a fellow of the American Academy of Arts and Sciences and a corresponding fellow of the British Academy, and in 2006 was elected a member of the American Philosophical Society. On October 9, 2017, he was elected as a corresponding fellow of the French Académie des sciences morales et politiques. He has held fellowships from the Guggenheim Foundation, the National Science Foundation, and the National Endowment for the Humanities. In 2008 he was awarded a Rolf Schock Prize for his work in philosophy, the Balzan Prize, and the honorary degree of Doctor of Letters from the University of Oxford.

== Philosophical work ==
=== Overview ===
Nagel thinks each person, owing to their capacity to reason, instinctively seeks a unified worldview, but that if this aspiration leads one to believe that there is only one way to understand our intellectual commitments, whether about the external world, knowledge, or what our practical and moral reasons ought to be, one errs. For contingent, limited, finite creatures, no such unified worldview is possible, because ways of understanding are not always better when they are more objective.

Like philosopher Bernard Williams, Nagel believes that the rise of modern science has permanently changed how people think of the world and our place in it. A modern scientific understanding is one way of thinking about the world and our place in it that is more objective than the commonsense view it replaces. It is more objective because it is less dependent on our peculiarities as the kinds of thinkers that people are. Our modern scientific understanding involves the mathematicized understanding of the world represented by modern physics. Understanding this bleached-out view of the world draws on our capacities as purely rational thinkers and fails to account for the specific nature of our perceptual sensibility. Nagel repeatedly returns to the distinction between certain qualities—that is, between primary qualities of objects like mass and shape, which are mathematically and structurally describable independent of our sensory apparatuses, and secondary qualities like taste and color, which depend on our sensory apparatuses.

Despite what may seem like skepticism about the objective claims of science, Nagel does not dispute that science describes the world that exists independently of us. His contention, rather, is that a given way of understanding a subject matter should not be regarded as better simply for being more objective. He argues that scientific understanding's attempt at an objective viewpoint—a "view from nowhere"—necessarily leaves out something essential when applied to the mind, which inherently has a subjective point of view. Accordingly, objective science is fundamentally unable to help people fully understand themselves. In "What Is It Like to Be a Bat?" and elsewhere, he writes that science cannot describe what it is like to be a thinker who conceives of the world from a particular subjective perspective.

Nagel argues that some phenomena are not best grasped from a more objective perspective. The standpoint of the thinker does not present itself to the thinker: they are that standpoint. One learns and uses mental concepts by being directly acquainted with one's own mind, whereas any attempt to think more objectively about mentality would abstract away from this fact. It would, of its nature, leave out what it is to be a thinker, and that, Nagel believes, would be a falsely objectifying view. Being a thinker is to have a subjective perspective on the world; if one abstracts away from this perspective, one leaves out what he sought to explain.

Nagel thinks that philosophers, over-impressed by the paradigm of the kind of objective understanding represented by modern science, tend to produce theories of the mind that are falsely objectifying in precisely this kind of way. They are right to be impressed—modern science really is objective—but wrong to take modern science to be the only paradigm of objectivity. The kind of understanding that science represents does not apply to everything people would like to understand.

As a philosophical rationalist, Nagel believes that a proper understanding of the place of mental properties in nature will involve a revolution in our understanding of the physical and the mental, and that this is a reasonable prospect that people can anticipate in the near future. A plausible science of the mind will give an account of the stuff that underpins mental and physical properties in such a way that people will simply be able to see that it necessitates both of these aspects. Now, it seems to people that the mental and the physical are irreducibly distinct, but that is not a metaphysical insight, or an acknowledgment of an irreducible explanatory gap, but simply where people are at their present stage of understanding.

Nagel's rationalism and tendency to present human nature as composite, structured around our capacity to reason, explain why he thinks that therapeutic or deflationary accounts of philosophy are complacent and that radical skepticism is, strictly speaking, irrefutable. The therapeutic or deflationary philosopher, influenced by Wittgenstein's later philosophy, reconciles people to the dependence of our worldview on our "form of life". Nagel accuses Wittgenstein and American philosopher of mind and language Donald Davidson of philosophical idealism. Both ask people to take up an interpretative perspective to make sense of other speakers in the context of a shared, objective world. This, for Nagel, elevates contingent conditions of our makeup into criteria for what is real. The result "cuts the world down to size" and makes what there is dependent on what there can be interpreted to be. Nagel claims this is no better than more orthodox forms of idealism in which reality is claimed to be made up of mental items, or constitutively dependent on a form supplied by the mind.

=== Philosophy of mind ===
==== What is it like to be a something ====
Nagel is probably most widely known in philosophy of mind as an advocate of the idea that consciousness and subjective experience cannot, at least with the contemporary understanding of physicalism, be satisfactorily explained with the concepts of physics. This position was primarily discussed by Nagel in one of his most famous articles: "What Is It Like to Be a Bat?" (1974). The article's title question, though often attributed to Nagel, was originally asked by Timothy Sprigge. The article was originally published in 1974 in The Philosophical Review, and has been reprinted several times, including in The Mind's I (edited by Daniel Dennett and Douglas Hofstadter), Readings in the Philosophy of Psychology (edited by Ned Block), Nagel's Mortal Questions (1979), The Nature of Mind (edited by David M. Rosenthal), and Philosophy of Mind: Classical and Contemporary Readings (edited by David J. Chalmers).

In "What Is It Like to Be a Bat?", Nagel argues that consciousness has essential to it a subjective character, a what it is like aspect. He writes, "an organism has conscious mental states if and only if there is something that it is like to be that organism—something it is like for the organism." In the 50th-anniversary republication of his article in book form, Nagel writes that he "tried to show that the irreducible subjectivity of consciousness is an obstacle to many proposed solutions to the mind-body problem." His critics have objected to what they see as a misguided attempt to argue from a fact about how one represents the world (trivially, one can only do so from one's point of view) to a false claim about the world, that it somehow has first-person perspectives built into it. On that understanding, Nagel is a conventional dualist about the physical and the mental. This is a misunderstanding: Nagel's point is that there is a constraint on what it is to possess the concept of a mental state, namely, that one be directly acquainted with it. Concepts of mental states are available only to thinkers who can be acquainted with their own states; the possession and use of physical concepts has no corresponding constraint.

Part of the puzzlement here is because of the limitations of imagination: influenced by his Princeton colleague Saul Kripke, Nagel believes that any type identity statement that identifies a physical state type with a mental state type would be, if true, necessarily true. But Kripke argues that one can easily imagine a situation where, for example, one's C-fibres are stimulated but one is not in pain, and so refute any such psychophysical identity from the armchair. (A parallel argument does not hold for genuine theoretical identities.) This argument that there is always an explanatory gap between an identification of a state in mental and physical terms is compounded, Nagel argues, by the fact that imagination operates in two distinct ways. When asked to imagine sensorily, one imagines C-fibres being stimulated; if asked to imagine sympathetically, one puts oneself in a conscious state resembling pain. These two ways of imagining the two terms of the identity statement are so different that there will always seem to be an explanatory gap, whether or not there is one. (Some philosophers of mind have taken this argument as helpful for physicalism on the grounds that it exposes a limitation that makes the existence of an explanatory gap seem compelling, while others have argued that this makes the case for physicalism even worse as it cannot be defended even in principle.)

Nagel is not a physicalist because he does not believe that an internal understanding of mental concepts shows them to have the kind of hidden essence that underpins a scientific identity in, say, chemistry. But his skepticism is about current physics: in his most recent work he says that people may be close to a scientific breakthrough in identifying an underlying essence that is neither physical (as people currently think of the physical) nor functional nor mental, but such that it necessitates all three of these ways in which the mind "appears" to us. The difference between the kind of explanation he rejects and the kind he accepts depends on his understanding of transparency: from his earliest work to his most recent, Nagel has always insisted that a prior context is required to make identity statements plausible, intelligible, and transparent.

==== Natural selection and consciousness ====
In his 2012 book Mind and Cosmos, Nagel argues against a materialist view of the emergence of life and consciousness, writing that the standard neo-Darwinian view flies in the face of common sense. He writes that mind is a basic aspect of nature, and that any philosophy of nature that cannot account for it is fundamentally misguided. He argues that the principles that account for the emergence of life may be teleological, rather than materialist or mechanistic. Despite Nagel's being an atheist and not a proponent of intelligent design (ID), his book was "praised by creationists", according to the New York Times. Nagel writes in Mind and Cosmos that he disagrees with both ID defenders and their opponents, who argue that the only naturalistic alternative to ID is the reductionist neo-Darwinian model.

Nagel has argued that ID should not be rejected as non-scientific. In 2008, he wrote, "ID is very different from creation science" and that the debate about ID "is clearly a scientific disagreement, not a disagreement between science and something else." In 2009, he named Signature in the Cell by the philosopher and ID proponent Stephen C. Meyer in The Times Literary Supplement as one of his "Best Books of the Year." Nagel does not accept Meyer's conclusions but endorsed Meyer's approach, and argued in Mind and Cosmos that Meyer and ID proponents David Berlinski and Michael Behe "do not deserve the scorn with which they are commonly met".

=== Ethics ===
==== Nagel's Rawlsian approach ====
Nagel has been highly influential in the related fields of moral and political philosophy. Originally supervised by John Rawls, he has been a longstanding proponent of a Kantian and rationalist approach to moral philosophy. His distinctive ideas were first presented in the short monograph The Possibility of Altruism, published in 1970. That book seeks by reflection on the nature of practical reasoning to uncover the formal principles that underlie reason in practice and the related general beliefs about the self that are necessary for those principles to apply to us. Nagel defends motivated desire theory about moral action. According to motivated desire theory, when a person is motivated to moral action it is indeed true that such actions are motivated, like all intentional actions, by a belief and a desire. But it is important to get the justificatory relations right: when a person accepts a moral judgment they are necessarily motivated to act. But it is the reason that does the justificatory work of justifying both the action and the desire. Nagel contrasts this view with a rival view on which a moral agent can accept that they have a reason to act only if the desire to carry out the action has an independent justification. An account based on presupposing sympathy would be of this kind.

The book's most striking claim is that there is a very close parallel between prudential reasoning in one's own interests and moral reasons to act to further another person's interests. When one reasons prudentially, for example about the future reasons one will have, one allows the future reasons to justify one's action without reference to the strength of one's desires. If a hurricane were to destroy someone's car next year, they will then want their insurance company to pay them to replace it: that future reason gives them a reason to take out insurance now. The strength of the reason ought not to be hostage to the strength of one's current desires. Denial of this view of prudence, Nagel argues, means that one does not really believe that one is the same person over time. One is dissolving oneself into distinct person-stages.

=== Atheism ===
In Mind and Cosmos, Nagel writes that he is an atheist: "I lack the sensus divinitatis that enables—indeed compels—so many people to see in the world the expression of divine purpose as naturally as they see in a smiling face the expression of human feeling." In The Last Word, he wrote, "I want atheism to be true and am made uneasy by the fact that some of the most intelligent and well-informed people I know are religious believers. It isn't just that I don't believe in God and, naturally, hope that I'm right in my belief. It’s that I hope there is no God! I don’t want there to be a God; I don’t want the universe to be like that."

=== Experience itself as a good ===
Nagel has said, "There are elements which, if added to one's experience, make life better; there are other elements which if added to one's experience, make life worse. But what remains when these are set aside is not merely neutral: it is emphatically positive. ... The additional positive weight is supplied by experience itself, rather than by any of its consequences."

== Personal life ==
Nagel married Doris Blum in 1954; they divorced in 1973. In 1979, he married Anne Hollander, who died in 2014. In 2022, he married Susan Chace.

== Awards ==
Nagel received the 1996 PEN/Diamonstein-Spielvogel Award for the Art of the Essay for Other Minds (1995). He has also been awarded the Balzan Prize in Moral Philosophy (2008), the Rolf Schock Prize in Logic and Philosophy of the Royal Swedish Academy of Sciences (2008), the Distinguished Achievement Award of the Mellon Foundation (2006), and the Berggruen Prize for Philosophy and Culture (2026).

== Selected publications ==
=== Books ===
- Nagel, Thomas (1970). The possibility of altruism. Princeton, N.J: Oxford University Press. ISBN 9780691020020. (Reprinted in 1978, Princeton University Press.)
- Nagel, Thomas; Held, Virginia; Morgenbesser, Sidney (1974). Philosophy, morality, and international affairs: essays edited for the Society for Philosophy and Public Affairs. New York: Oxford University Press. ISBN 9780195017595.
- Nagel, Thomas (1979). Mortal questions. London: Canto. ISBN 9780521406765.
- Nagel, Thomas (1986). The view from nowhere. New York: Oxford University Press. ISBN 9780195056440.
- Nagel, Thomas (1987). What does it all mean?: a very short introduction to philosophy. Oxford: Oxford University Press. ISBN 9780195174373.
- Nagel, Thomas (1991). Equality and partiality. New York: Oxford University Press. ISBN 9780195098396.
- Nagel, Thomas (1997). The last word. New York: Oxford University Press. ISBN 9780195149838.
- Nagel, Thomas (1999). Other minds: critical essays, 1969–1994. New York Oxford: Oxford University Press. ISBN 9780195132465.
- Nagel, Thomas; Murphy, Liam (2002). The myth of ownership : taxes and justice. Oxford New York: Oxford University Press. ISBN 9780195176568.
- Nagel, Thomas (2002). Concealment and exposure: and other essays. Oxford New York: Oxford University Press. ISBN 9780195152937.
- Nagel, Thomas (2010). Secular philosophy and the religious temperament: essays 2002–2008. Oxford New York, N.Y: Oxford University Press. ISBN 9780195394115.
- Nagel, Thomas (2012). Mind and Cosmos: why the materialist neo-Darwinian conception of nature is almost certainly false. Oxford New York: Oxford University Press, ISBN 9780199919758

=== Articles ===
- 1959, "Hobbes's Concept of Obligation", Philosophical Review, pp. 68–83.
- 1959, "Dreaming", Analysis, pp. 112–6.
- 1965, "Physicalism", Philosophical Review, pp. 339–56.
- 1969, "Sexual Perversion", Journal of Philosophy, pp. 5–17 (repr. in Mortal Questions).
- 1969, "The Boundaries of Inner Space", Journal of Philosophy, pp. 452–8.
- 1970, "Death", Nous, pp. 73–80 (repr. in Mortal Questions).
- 1970, "Armstrong on the Mind", Philosophical Review, pp. 394–403 (a discussion review of A Materialist Theory of the Mind by D. M. Armstrong).
- 1971, "Brain Bisection and the Unity of Consciousness", Synthese, pp. 396–413 (repr. in Mortal Questions).
- 1971, "The Absurd", Journal of Philosophy, pp. 716–27 (repr. in Mortal Questions).
- 1972, "War and Massacre", Philosophy & Public Affairs, vol. 1, pp. 123–44 (repr. in Mortal Questions).
- 1973, "Rawls on Justice", Philosophical Review, pp. 220–34 (a discussion review of A Theory of Justice by John Rawls).
- 1973, "Equal Treatment and Compensatory Discrimination", Philosophy & Public Affairs, vol. 2, pp. 348–62.
- 1974, "What Is it Like to Be a Bat?", Philosophical Review, pp. 435–50 (repr. in Mortal Questions). Online text
- 1976, "Moral Luck", Proceedings of the Aristotelian Society Supplementary vol. 50, pp. 137–55 (repr. in Mortal Questions).
- 1979, "The Meaning of Equality", Washington University Law Quarterly, pp. 25–31.
- 1981, "Tactical Nuclear Weapons and the Ethics of Conflict", Parameters: Journal of the U.S. Army War College, pp. 327–8.
- 1983, "The Objective Self", in Carl Ginet and Sydney Shoemaker (eds.), Knowledge and Mind, Oxford University Press, pp. 211–232.
- 1987, "Moral Conflict and Political Legitimacy", Philosophy & Public Affairs, pp. 215–240.
- 1994, "Consciousness and Objective Reality", in R. Warner and T. Szubka (eds.), The Mind-Body Problem, Blackwell.
- 1995, "Personal Rights and Public Space", Philosophy & Public Affairs, vol. 24, no. 2, pp. 83–107.
- 1997, "Assisted Suicide: The Philosophers' Brief" (with R. Dworkin, R. Nozick, J. Rawls, T. Scanlon, and J. J. Thomson), New York Review of Books, March 27, 1997.
- 1998, "Reductionism and Antireductionism", in The Limits of Reductionism in Biology, Novartis Symposium 213, John Wiley & Sons, pp. 3–10.
- 1998, "Concealment and Exposure", Philosophy & Public Affairs, vol. 27, no. 1, pp. 3–30. Online text
- 1998, "Conceiving the Impossible and the Mind-Body Problem", Philosophy, vol. 73, no. 285, pp. 337–352. Online PDF
- 2000, "The Psychophysical Nexus", in Paul Boghossian and Christopher Peacocke (eds.) New Essays on the A Priori, Oxford: Clarendon Press, pp. 432–471. Online PDF
- 2003, "Rawls and Liberalism", in Samuel Freeman (ed.) The Cambridge Companion to Rawls, Cambridge University Press, pp. 62–85.
- 2003, "John Rawls and Affirmative Action", The Journal of Blacks in Higher Education, no. 39, pp. 82–4.
- 2008, "Public Education and Intelligent Design", Philosophy and Public Affairs
- 2009, "The I in Me", a review article of Selves: An Essay in Revisionary Metaphysics by Galen Strawson, Oxford, 448 pp, ISBN 0-19-825006-1, lrb.co.uk
- 2021, Thomas Nagel, "Types of Intuition: Thomas Nagel on human rights and moral knowledge", London Review of Books, vol. 43, no. 11 (3 June 2021), pp. 3, 5–6, 8. Deontology, consequentialism, utilitarianism.
- 2023: "Leader of the Martians" (review of M.W. Rowe, J.L. Austin: Philosopher and D-Day Intelligence Officer, Oxford, May 2023, ISBN 978 0 19 870758 5, 660 pp.), London Review of Books, vol. 45, no. 17 (7 September 2023), pp. 9–10. "I [the reviewer, Thomas Nagel] was one of Austin's last students..." (p. 10.) A quotation from J.L. Austin: "Is it not possible that the next century may see the birth... of a true and comprehensive science of language? Then we shall have rid ourselves of one more part of philosophy... in the only way we ever can get rid of philosophy, by kicking it upstairs." (p. 10.)

== See also ==
- American philosophy
- List of American philosophers
- New York University Department of Philosophy
- David Chalmers
- Frank Jackson
- Galen Strawson
- Hard problem of consciousness
- Knowledge argument
- Phenomenology
- Neutral monism

Academic offices
New office	Tanner Lecturer on Human Values at Stanford University; 1977–1978	Succeeded by Amartya Sen
Preceded by Michael Dummett	Howison Lecturer in Philosophy; 1987	Succeeded by Bernard Williams
Vacant Title last held by Barry Stroud	John Locke Lecturer; 1989–1990	Succeeded by John McDowell
Awards
Preceded by J. B. Jackson	PEN/Diamonstein-Spielvogel Award for the Art of the Essay; 1996	Succeeded by Cynthia Ozick
Preceded by Bruce Beutler	Balzan Prize; 2008; With: Wallace S. Broecker, Maurizio Calvesi, and Ian Frazer	Succeeded by Terence Cave
Preceded by Karlheinz Böhm	Balzan Prize; 2008; With: Wallace S. Broecker, Maurizio Calvesi, and Ian Frazer	Succeeded by Michael Grätzel
Preceded by The Lady Higgins	Balzan Prize; 2008; With: Wallace S. Broecker, Maurizio Calvesi, and Ian Frazer	Succeeded by Brenda Milner
Preceded by Jules A. Hoffmann	Balzan Prize; 2008; With: Wallace S. Broecker, Maurizio Calvesi, and Ian Frazer	Succeeded by Brenda Milner
Preceded by Sumio Iijima	Balzan Prize; 2008; With: Wallace S. Broecker, Maurizio Calvesi, and Ian Frazer	Succeeded by Paolo Rossi Monti
Preceded by Michel Zink	Balzan Prize; 2008; With: Wallace S. Broecker, Maurizio Calvesi, and Ian Frazer	Succeeded by Paolo Rossi Monti
Preceded by Jaakko Hintikka	Rolf Schock Prize for Logic and Philosophy; 2008	Succeeded by Hilary Putnam
