= Julia Driver =

American philosopher (born 1961)

- Born: 1961 (age 64–65)
- Spouse: Roy Sorensen
- Awards: Laurance S. Rockefeller Fellowship (Princeton University); NEH Fellowship; HLA Hart Fellowship (University of Oxford)

Education
- Education: University of Texas at Austin (BA, 1983); Johns Hopkins University (PhD, 1990)
- Doctoral advisor: Susan R. Wolf

Philosophical work
- Institutions: University of Texas at Austin (2019–present); Washington University in St. Louis; Dartmouth College; Virginia Tech; Brooklyn College; University of St Andrews (Professorial Fellow)
- Main interests: Moral philosophy, Ethics, Virtue theory
- Notable works: Uneasy Virtue (2001); Consequentialism; Ethics: The Fundamentals
- Notable ideas: Consequentialist approach to virtue ethics

Julia Driver (born 1961) is professor of philosophy and holder of the Darrell K. Royal Chair in Ethics and American Society at the University of Texas at Austin. She is a specialist in moral philosophy.

== Education and career ==
She received her Ph.D. in philosophy at Johns Hopkins University in 1990 under the supervision of Susan R. Wolf. She received her BA from the University of Texas at Austin in 1983.

Before moving to Texas in 2019, she taught at Washington University in St. Louis, Dartmouth College, Virginia Tech, and Brooklyn College. She and her husband philosopher Roy Sorensen are also professorial fellows at University of St Andrews. She has received a Laurance S. Rockefeller Fellowship from Princeton University, NEH Fellowship, and an HLA Hart Fellowship at University of Oxford From 2018 to 2023, she was co-editor of the journal Ethics: An International Journal of Social, Political, and Legal Philosophy.

== Philosophical work ==
She is the author of Uneasy Virtue, Consequentialism, and Ethics: The Fundamentals, as well as many articles in ethics and moral psychology. She is the leading proponent of a consequentialist approach to virtue theory. According to Driver, the virtues are character traits that systematically produce good consequences. Her proposal differs from that of many other theories as she argues that virtue does not always require knowledge. Indeed, virtue can at times be impeded by knowledge.

In 2015, her book Consequentialism was translated by Iranian philosopher Shirzad Peik Herfeh into Persian.

== See also ==
- Consequentialism
- List of American philosophers
