= Abraham Kaplan =

American philosopher

- Born: June 11, 1918; Odesa, Russian Empire
- Died: June 19, 1993 (aged 75); Los Angeles, California, U.S.
- Education: University of California, Los Angeles
- Occupation: Philosopher

Abraham Kaplan (June 11, 1918 – June 19, 1993) was an American Jewish philosopher, known best for being the first philosopher to systematically examine the behavioral sciences in his book The Conduct of Inquiry (1964). His thinking was influenced by pragmatists Charles Sanders Peirce, William James, and John Dewey.

== Biography ==
Kaplan's parents were Joseph J. and Chava (Lerner) Kaplan. Abraham's father was a rabbi. He was raised in Odesa, Ukraine. He became a naturalized citizen of the United States in 1930, after immigrating to the country in 1923. In 1937, he graduated in chemistry from the College of St. Thomas. He received a Ph.D. in philosophy 1942 from the University of California, Los Angeles. He was assistant professor at New York University from 1940 to 1945. He then returned to the UCLA Department of Philosophy as assistant professor for the next four years of his life, and associate professor for three years after that. Kaplan became a professor of philosophy in 1952, and stayed there for twelve years. He was also chair of the department for those twelve years, along with two years past that.

He taught at the University of Michigan from 1962 to 1972 as well. Then, in 1978, he moved to teaching at University of Haifa in Israel, where he also served as dean of the faculty of social sciences. From 1977 to 1984 he was a faculty member of the RAND Graduate School in Santa Monica, California. Kaplan also taught at Harvard University, California Institute of Technology, California State Polytechnic University, Pomona, the University of Hawai'i at Manoa and several other schools. While at Harvard, he taught Stanley Cavell. He was also president of the American Philosophical Association from 1947 to 1958.

His co-authored book with Harold Lasswell Power and Society: a framework for political inquiry was published in 1950. His The conduct of inquiry: methodology for behavioral science was published in 1964.

Kaplan was named one of the top ten teachers in the United States in 1966 by Time magazine. He also traveled to India, Israel, and Japan to study their cultures and beliefs.

On November 17, 1939, Abraham Kaplan married Iona Judith Wax, a child psychologist. They had two children: Karen Eva Kaplan Diskin (1943-1996) and Jessica Aryia Kaplan Symonds. Karen was married to an Israeli and lived in Haifa. She had three children. She died suddenly at the age of 53, three years after her father’s death.

== Bibliography ==
- Power and Society: A Framework for Political Inquiry, 1951
- The new world of philosophy, 1961
- American ethics and public policy, 1963
- The conduct of inquiry: methodology for behavioral science, 1964
- Individuality and the New Society, 1970
- Love ... and death : talks on contemporary and perennial themes, 1973
- In pursuit of wisdom: the scope of philosophy, 1977
- Freedom and terror : reason and unreason in politics, 2011. With Gabriel Weimann.

== See also ==
- American philosophy
