= Gerald Dworkin =

American philosopher (born 1937)

Gerald Dworkin (born 1937) is an American philosopher specializing in moral, political, and legal theory. He is Distinguished Professor of Philosophy Emeritus at the University of California, Davis. In 2016–17, he was Brady Distinguished Visiting Professor of Ethics and Civic Life at Northwestern University. He has written for the Stanford Encyclopedia of Philosophy.

== Early life and education ==
Dworkin earned his Ph.D. at the University of California, Berkeley in 1966.

== Career ==
Dworkin has taught at Harvard, MIT, and the University of Illinois Chicago. He has been a visiting Fellow of All Souls College (Oxford), the Australian National University, and the Hastings Center. He was the Centennial Visiting Professor at the London School of Economics. In 2006, he was a Distinguished Visitor at the Chinese University of Hong Kong, where he gave a series of lectures on paternalism.

Dworkin's main areas of research include the nature and justification of autonomy, paternalism in the criminal law, and the issue of which acts may legitimately be criminalized by the state. Most recently he has been working on the ethics of lying and deception. An article in The New York Times "Are these 10 Lies Justified?" which listed lies he thought permissible and asked for readers to respond if they disagreed received more than 10,000 responses. His most recent publication is on whether, and how, deception interferes with autonomy. It will appear in the Routledge Handbook on Autonomy (ed. Ben Colburn).

One of Dworkin's books is a defense of physician-assisted suicide. In it, he argues that doctors who approve of withdrawing patients from life support at their request, or administering pain-relief medication that is foreseen to kill the patient, or who approve of terminal sedation, are inconsistent if they condemn physician-assisted suicide. This book has been published in Spanish- and Korean-language editions.

In 1976, Dworkin published, along with N. J. Block, an anthology critical of IQ research titled The IQ Controversy: Critical Readings.

He has published two e-books Philosophy: A Commonplace Book, Vols. 1 and 2, which are collections of aphorisms, jokes, witty comments on philosophy, and other interesting quotations.
