= Arthur Lyon Cross =

American historian

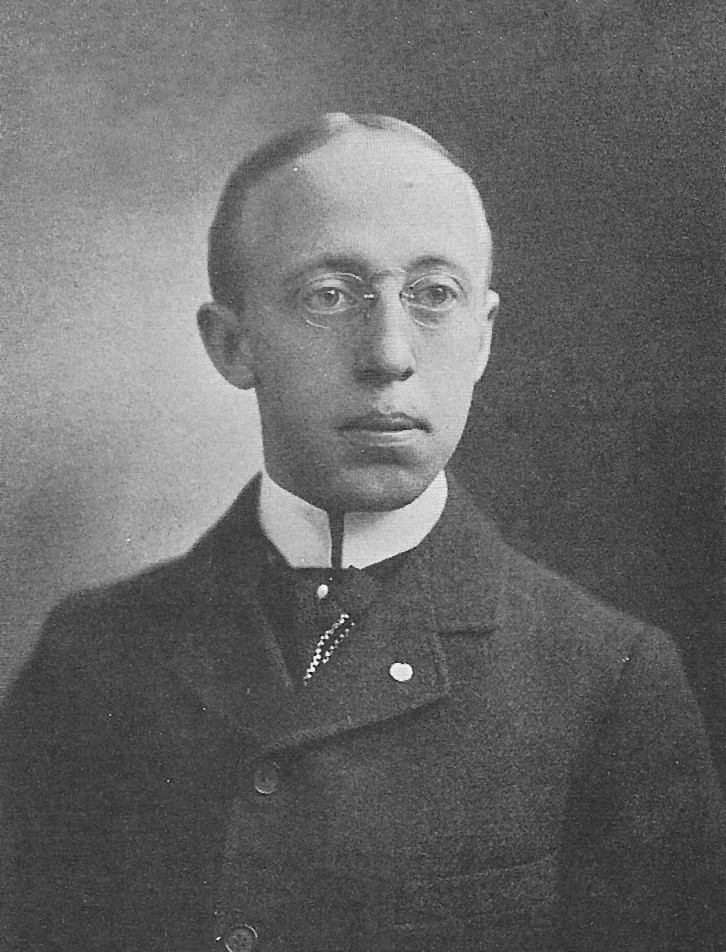
Arthur Lyon Cross

Arthur Lyon Cross (November 14, 1873 – June 21, 1940) was an American historian specializing in English history. Born in Portland, Maine, he received his doctorate from Harvard and joined the faculty of the University of Michigan in 1899.

In 1914, his best-known work, A History of England and Greater Britain, was published. His other works include The Anglican Episcopate and the American Colonies, which was based on his Ph.D. thesis, and A Recent History of English Laws.

In 1933, the federal government prosecuted Oscar Hartzell for swindling thousands of people out of their money by claiming he was the descendant of Sir Francis Drake but he needed money to obtain legal decrees from Britain. The federal prosecutor called Lyon to testify as an expert witness that Drake had no heirs and his wealth reverted to the Crown. A federal jury convicted Hartzell, in part, because Cross was able to definitively convince them that Hartzell's claim of being an heir to wealth was an impossibility.
