= Pyrrho =

Greek philosopher and founder of Pyrrhonism (c. 360 – c. 270 BC)

- Born: c. 365–360 BC; Elis, Greece
- Died: c. 275–270 BC (aged c. 85–95); Elis, Greece

Philosophical work
- Era: Hellenistic philosophy
- Region: Western philosophy
- School: Skepticism; Pyrrhonism
- Main interests: Epistemology, metaphysics, ethics
- Notable ideas: Philosophical skepticism, ataraxia, adiaphora, epoché

Pyrrho of Elis (/ˈpɪroʊ/; Ancient Greek: Πύρρων ὁ Ἠλεῖος; c. 360 – c. 270 BC) was a Greek philosopher of Classical antiquity, credited as being the first Greek skeptic philosopher and founder of Pyrrhonism.

== Life ==
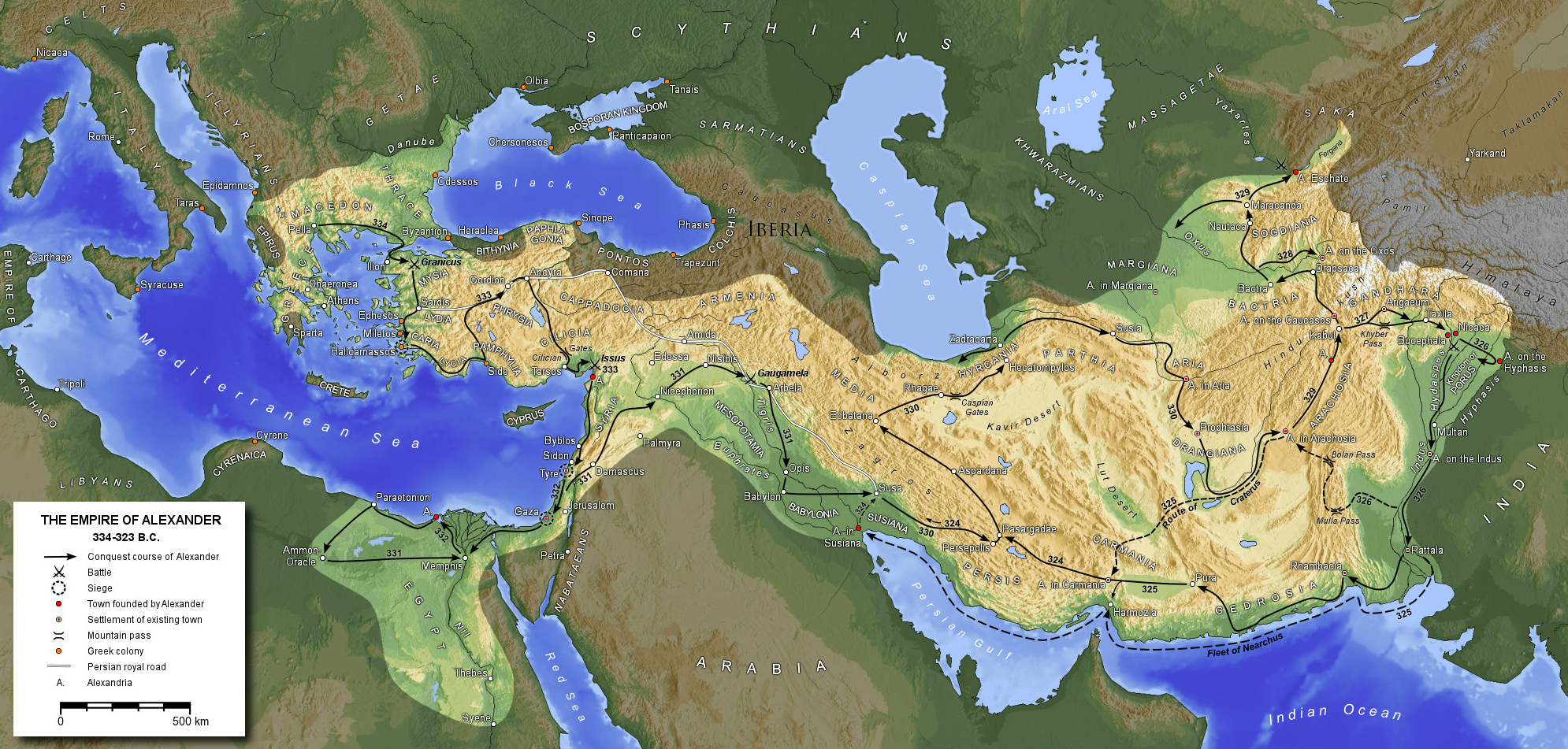
Map of Alexander the Great's empire and the route he and Pyrrho took to India

Pyrrho of Elis is estimated to have lived from around 365/360 until 275/270 BCE. Pyrrho was from Elis, on the Ionian Sea. He was likely a member of the Klytidiai, a clan of seers in Elis who interpreted the oracles of the Temple of Zeus at Olympia where Pyrrho served as a high priest. The Klytidiai were descendants of Klytios, who was the son of Alcmaeon and the grandson of Amphiaraus. In the Python, Pyrrho's student Timon of Phlius describes first meeting Pyrrho on the grounds of an Amphiareion, i.e., a temple of Amphiaraus, while they were both on a pilgrimage to Delphi.

Most biographical information on Pyrrho, as well as some information concerning his demeanor and behavior, come from Diogenes Laertius; his work on Pyrrho's life drew primarily from the works of mid-third century BC biographer Antigonus of Carystus. Unlike the founders of other Hellenistic philosophies, Pyrrho was not substantively influenced by Socrates.

Pyrrho, along with Anaxarchus, travelled with Alexander the Great on his Indian campaign, "so that he even went as far as the Gymnosophists in India and the Magi" in Persia.

== Philosophy ==
Pyrrho did not produce any written work. Most of the information on Pyrrho's philosophy comes from his student Timon. Only fragments of what Timon wrote have been preserved, mostly by Sextus Empiricus, Diogenes Laertius, and Eusebius. Little is known for certain about the details of Pyrrho's philosophy and how it may have differed from later Pyrrhonism. Most of what we know today as Pyrrhonism comes through the book Outlines of Pyrrhonism written by Sextus Empiricus over 400 years after Pyrrho's death.

Most sources agree that the primary goal of Pyrrho's philosophy was the achievement of a state of ataraxia (similar to the Indo-Aryan nirvana), the freedom from mental perturbation, and that he observed that ataraxia could be brought about by eschewing beliefs (dogma) about thoughts and perceptions. However, Pyrrho's own philosophy may have differed significantly in details from later Pyrrhonism. Most interpretations of the information on Pyrrho's philosophy suggest that he claimed that reality is inherently indeterminate, which, in the view of Pyrrhonism described by Sextus Empiricus, would be considered a negative dogmatic belief.

A summary of Pyrrho's philosophy was preserved by Eusebius, quoting Aristocles, quoting Timon, in what is known as the "Aristocles passage." There are conflicting interpretations of the ideas presented in this passage, each of which leads to a different conclusion as to what Pyrrho meant:

'The things themselves are equally indifferent, and unstable, and indeterminate, and therefore neither our senses nor our opinions are either true or false. For this reason then we must not trust them, but be without opinions, and without bias, and without wavering, saying of every single thing that it no more is than is not, or both is and is not, or neither is nor is not.'

It is uncertain whether Pyrrhonism was a small but continuous movement in antiquity or whether it died out and was revived. Regardless, several centuries after Pyrrho lived, Aenesidemus led a revival of the philosophy. Pyrrhonism was one of the two major schools of philosophical skepticism that emerged during the Hellenistic period, the other being Academic skepticism.

Pyrrhonists view their philosophy as a way of life, and view Pyrrho as a model for this way of life. Their main goal is to attain ataraxia through achieving a state of epoché (i.e., suspension of judgment) about beliefs. One method Pyrrhonists use to suspend judgment is to gather arguments on both sides of the disputed issue, continuing to gather arguments such that the arguments have the property of isostheneia (equal strength). This leads the Pyrrhonist to the conclusion that there is an unresolvable disagreement on the topic, and so the appropriate reaction is to suspend judgment. Eventually the Pyrrhonist develops epoché as a habitual response to all matters of dispute, which results in ataraxia.

== Ancient Indian influences on Pyrrho ==
Diogenes Laërtius' biography of Pyrrho reports that Pyrrho traveled with Alexander the Great's army on its conquest of India (327 to 325 BCE) and based his philosophy on what he learned there:

...he even went as far as the Gymnosophists, in India, and the Magi. Owing to which circumstance, he seems to have taken a noble line in philosophy, introducing the doctrine of incomprehensibility, and of the necessity of suspending one's judgment....

The sources and the extent of the Indian influences on Pyrrho's philosophy, however, are disputed. Philosophical skepticism was already present in Greek philosophy, particularly in the Democritean tradition in which Pyrrho had studied prior to visiting India. Richard Bett heavily discounts any substantive Indian influences on Pyrrho, arguing that based on the testimony of Onesicritus regarding how difficult it was to converse with the gymnosophists, as it required three translators, none of whom understood any philosophy, it is highly improbable that Pyrrho could have been substantively influenced by any of the Indian philosophers. According to Indologist and Buddhist scholar Johannes Bronkhorst, early Buddhism and Pyrrho's philosophy share no connection.

It has also been hypothesized that the gymnosophists were Jains, or Ajnanins, and that these are likely influences on Pyrrho. Authors see probable influence of Indian skepticism not only in Pyrrhonism, but also in Buddhism itself as a common ground.

== Sources ==
- Algra, K., Barnes, J., Mansfeld, J. and Schofield, M. (eds.), The Cambridge History of Hellenistic Philosophy, Cambridge: Cambridge University Press, 1999.
- Annas, Julia and Barnes, Jonathan, The Modes of Scepticism: Ancient Texts and Modern Interpretations, Cambridge: Cambridge University Press, 1985.
- Barua, Benimadhab (1921). A History of Pre-Buddhistic Indian Philosophy (1st ed.). London: University of Calcutta. p. 468.
- Beckwith, Christopher I., Greek Buddha. Princeton and Oxford: Princeton University Press, 2015.
- Bett, Richard, "Aristocles on Timon on Pyrrho: The Text, Its Logic and its Credibility" Oxford Studies in Ancient Philosophy 12, (1994): 137–181.
- Bett, Richard, "What did Pyrrho Think about the Nature of the Divine and the Good?" Phronesis 39, (1994): 303–337.
- Bett, Richard, Pyrrho, His Antecedents, and His Legacy, Oxford: Oxford University Press, 2000.
- Brunschwig, Jacques, "Introduction: the Beginnings of Hellenistic Epistemology" in Algra, Barnes, Mansfeld and Schofield (eds.), The Cambridge History of Hellenistic Philosophy, Cambridge: Cambridge University Press, 1999, 229–259.
- Burnyeat, Myles (ed.), The Skeptical Tradition, Berkeley: University of California Press, 1983.
- Burnyeat, Myles and Frede, Michael (eds.), The Original Sceptics: A Controversy, Indianapolis: Hackett, 1997.
- Doomen, Jasper, "The Problems of Scepticism" Logical Analysis and History of Philosophy 10 (2007): 36–52.
- Flintoff, Everard (1980). "Pyrrho and India". Phronesis. 25 (1): 88–108. doi:10.1163/156852880X00052. JSTOR 4182084.
- Halkias, Georgios, "The Self-immolation of Kalanos and other Luminous Encounters among Greeks and Indian Buddhists in the Hellenistic world". Journal of the Oxford Centre for Buddhist Studies, Vol. VIII, 2015: 163–186.
- Halkias, Georgios, "Yavanayāna: Scepticism as Soteriology in Aristocle’s Passage". In Buddhism and Scepticism ed. Oren Hanner. Hamburg Buddhist Studies Series 13, University of Hamburg, 83-108.
- Hankinson, R.J., The Sceptics, London: Routledge, 1995.
- Jayatilleke, K.N. (1963). Early Buddhist Theory of Knowledge (PDF) (1st ed.). London: George Allen & Unwin Ltd. p. 524. Archived from the original (PDF) on 11 September 2015.
- Kuzminski, Adrian, Pyrrhonism; How the Ancient Greeks Reinvented Buddhism, Lanham, Lexington Books, 2008.
- Long, A.A., Hellenistic Philosophy: Stoics, Epicureans, Sceptics, University of California Press, 1986.
- Long, A.A. and Sedley, David, The Hellenistic Philosophers, Cambridge: Cambridge University Press, 1987.
- Striker, Gisela, "On the difference between the Pyrrhonists and the Academics" in G. Striker, Essays on Hellenistic Epistemology and Ethics, Cambridge: Cambridge University Press, 1996, 135–149.
- Striker, Gisela, "Sceptical strategies" in G. Striker, Essays on Hellenistic Epistemology and Ethics, Cambridge: Cambridge University Press, 1996, 92-115.
- Striker, Gisela, "The Ten Tropes of Aenesidemus" in G. Striker, Essays on Hellenistic Epistemology and Ethics, Cambridge: Cambridge University Press, 1996, 116–134.
- Svavarsson, Svavar Hrafn, "Pyrrho's dogmatic nature", The Classical Quarterly, 52 (2002): 248–56.
- Svavarsson, Svavar Hrafn, "Pyrrho's undecidable nature", Oxford Studies in Ancient Philosophy, 27 (2004): 249–295.
