= Michael Frede =

German scholar of ancient philosophy (1940–2007)

- Born: 31 May 1940; Berlin, Nazi Germany
- Died: 11 August 2007 (aged 67); Agios Minas, Greece

Education
- Education: LMU Munich; University of Hamburg; University of Göttingen (PhD)
- Doctoral advisor: Günther Patzig
- Other advisors: J. L. Ackrill; G. E. L. Owen

Philosophical work
- Era: Contemporary philosophy
- Region: Western philosophy
- School: Analytic philosophy
- Institutions: University of Göttingen; University of California, Berkeley; Princeton University; Keble College, Oxford
- Notable students: Michael N. Forster
- Main interests: Ancient philosophy

Michael Frede (German: [ˈfʁeːdə]; 31 May 1940 – 11 August 2007) was a German scholar of ancient philosophy, described by The Telegraph as "one of the most important and adventurous scholars of ancient philosophy of recent times."

== Education and career ==
Frede earned his Ph.D. at the University of Göttingen in 1966 and worked there as an assistant (Wissenschaftlicher Assistent) from 1966 to 1971.

He joined the faculty of the philosophy department at University of California, Berkeley as an assistant professor (1971) and quickly rose to the status of full professor. From 1976 to 1991, he was a professor at the Princeton University Philosophy Department.

He returned to Europe in 1991 and took the chair in the history of philosophy at the University of Oxford. In 1997-8 he returned to Berkeley to lecture on free will as the 84th visiting Sather Professor of Classical Literature; the resulting book was published posthumously. He retired from Oxford in 2005 and lived in Athens, Greece, until his death in a drowning accident in 2007.

He was a Member of the Göttingen Academy of Sciences and a Fellow of both the British Academy (elected 1994) and the American Academy of Arts and Sciences.

== Selected works ==
- Pradikation und Existenzaussage: Platons Gebrauch von "...ist..." und "...ist nicht..." im Sophistes, 1967
- Die Stoische Logik, 1974
- Galen. Three Treatises on the Nature of Science (co-edited with Richard Walzer), 1985
- Essays in Ancient Philosophy, 1987
- Aristoteles 'Metaphysik Z': Text, Übersetzung und Kommentar, 2 vols (with Günther Patzig), 1988
- The Original Sceptics: A Controversy (co-edited with Myles Burnyeat), 1997
- Rationality in Greek Thought (co-edited with Gisela Striker), 1999
- Pagan Monotheism in Late Antiquity (co-edited with Polymnia Athanassiadi), 2001
- Aristotle's Metaphysics Book Lambda (co-edited with David Charles), 2001
- A Free Will: origins of the notion in ancient thought (edited by A. A. Long with a foreword by David Sedley), 2011
- The Pseudo-Platonic Seventh Letter (Uehiro Series in Practical Ethics), (co-author with Myles Burnyeat) Oxford University Press 2015
