= David Charles (philosopher) =

British philosopher (1947–2026)

David Owain Maurice Charles, FLSW (September 1947 – 12 August 2026) was a British philosopher, who was a professor of philosophy and classics at Yale University. He has previously been Colin Prestige Fellow, and Professor of Philosophy at Oriel College, Oxford, and CUF Lecturer in Philosophy, Faculty of Philosophy, Oxford University, and has been a visiting professor at the University of California at Los Angeles and at Rutgers University, New Jersey.

== Life and career ==
Charles held a doctorate (D.Phil.) in philosophy from Oxford University. His research interests were in issues concerning meaning, definition and practical skill and interconnections between philosophy and psychiatry. He has published on Greek philosophy and on contemporary philosophy of mind and metaphysics.

He was elected a Fellow of the Learned Society of Wales in 2012.

Charles died on 12 August 2026, at the age of 78.

== Publications ==
- Aristotle's Philosophy of Action (1984)
- (co-editor with Kathleen Lennon) Reduction, Explanation and Realism (1992)
- (co-editor with Theodore Scaltsas and Mary Louise Gill) Unity, Identity and Explanation in Aristotle’s Metaphysics (1994)
- Aristotle on Meaning and Essence (2000)
- (co-editor with Michael Frede) Aristotle’s Metaphysics Book Lambda, (2000)
- (co-editor with William Child) Wittgensteinian themes: essays in honour of David Pears (2001)
- (editor) Definition in Greek Philosophy (2010)
