= Tanner Lectures on Human Values =

Prestigious teaching sessions on society

The Tanner Lectures on Human Values is a multi-university lecture series in the humanities, founded in 1978, at Clare Hall, Cambridge University, by the American scholar Obert Clark Tanner. In founding the lecture, he defined their purpose as follows:

I hope these lectures will contribute to the intellectual and moral life of mankind. I see them simply as a search for a better understanding of human behavior and human values. This understanding may be pursued for its own intrinsic worth, but it may also eventually have practical consequences for the quality of personal and social life.

It is considered one of the top lecture series among top universities, and being appointed a lectureship is a recognition of the scholar's "extra-ordinary achievement" in the field of human values.

== Member institutions ==
Permanent lectureships are established at the following nine institutions:

- Linacre College, Oxford
- University of California, Berkeley
- Clare Hall, Cambridge
- Harvard University
- University of Michigan
- Princeton University
- Stanford University
- University of Utah
- Yale University

== Lecturers ==
- 1976-77 (Michigan) Joel Feinberg—"Voluntary Euthanasia and the Inalienable Right to Life"
- 1977-78 (Stanford) Thomas Nagel—"The Limits of Objectivity"
- 1977-78 (Michigan) Karl Popper—"Three Worlds"
- 1977-78 (Oxford) John Rawls—"The Basic Liberties and Their Priority"
- 1978-79 (Utah) Lord Ashby—"The Search for an Environmental Ethic"
- 1978-79 (Utah State) R.M. Hare—"Moral Conflicts"
- 1978-79 (Stanford) Amartya Sen—"Equality of What?"
- 1978-79 (Michigan) Edward O. Wilson—"Comparative Social Theory"
- 1979-80 (Cambridge) Raymond Aron—"Arms Control and Peace Research"
- 1979-80 (Oxford) Jonathan Bennett—"Morality and Consequences"
- 1979-80 (Michigan) Robert Coles—"Children as Moral Observers"
- 1979-80 (Stanford) Michel Foucault—"Omnes et Singulatim: Towards a Criticism of 'Political Reason'"
- 1979-80 (Utah) Wallace Stegner—"The Twilight of Self-Reliance: Frontier Values and Contemporary America"
- 1979-80 (Harvard) George Stigler—"Economics or Ethics?"
- 1980-81 (Harvard) Brian Barry—"Do Countries Have Moral Obligations? The Case of World Poverty"
- 1980-81 (Oxford) Saul Bellow—"A Writer from Chicago"
- 1980-81 (Stanford) Charles Fried—"Is Liberty Possible?"
- 1980-81 (Cambridge) John Passmore—"The Representative Arts as a Source of Truth"
- 1980-81 (Utah) Joan Robinson—"The Arms Race"
- 1980-81 (Hebrew University) Solomon H. Snyder—"Drugs and the Brain and Society"
- 1981-82 (Cambridge) Kingman Brewster—"The Voluntary Society"
- 1981-82 (Oxford) Freeman Dyson—"Bombs and Poetry"
- 1981-82 (Australian National University) Leszek Kolakowski—"The Death of Utopia Reconsidered"
- 1981-82 (Utah) Richard Lewontin—"Biological Determinism"
- 1981-82 (Michigan) Thomas C. Schelling—"Ethics, Law, and the Exercise of Self-Command"
- 1981-82 (Stanford) Alan Stone—"Psychiatry and Morality"
- 1982-83 (Utah) Carlos Fuentes—"A Writer from Mexico"
- 1982-83 (Stanford) David Gauthier—"The Incompleat Egoist"
- 1982-83 (Cambridge) H.C. Robbins Landon—"Haydn and Eighteenth-Century Patronage in Austria and Hungary"
- 1982-83 (Jawaharlal Nehru University) Ilya Prigogine—"Only an Illusion"
- 1983-84 (Oxford): Donald D. Brown—"The Impact of Modern Genetics"
- 1983-84 (Stanford): Leonard B. Meyer—"Music and Ideology in the Nineteenth Century"
- 1983-84 (Utah): Helmut Schmidt—"The Future of the Atlantic Alliance"
- 1983-84 (Michigan): Herbert Simon—"Scientific Literacy as a Goal in a High-Technology Society"
- 1983-84 (Harvard): Quentin Skinner—"The Paradoxes of Political Liberty"
- 1983-84 (Helsinki): Georg Henrik von Wright—"Of Human Freedom"
- 1984-85 (Michigan): Nadine Gordimer—"The Essential Gesture: Writers and Responsibility"
- 1984-85 (Oxford): Barrington Moore—"Authority and Inequality under Capitalism and Socialism"
- 1984-85 (Cambridge): Amartya K. Sen—"The Standard of Living"
- 1984-85 (Stanford): Michael Slote—"Moderation, Rationality, and Virtue"
- 1985-86 (Stanford): Stanley Cavell—"The Uncanniness of the Ordinary"
- 1985-86 (Michigan): Clifford Geertz—"The Uses of Diversity"
- 1985-86 (Utah): Arnold S. Relman—"Medicine as a Profession and a Business"
- 1985-86 (Oxford) T. M. Scanlon—"The Significance of Choice"
- 1985-86 (Harvard): Michael Walzer—"Interpretation and Social Criticism"
- 1986-87 (Cambridge): Roger Bulger—"On Hippocrates, Thomas Jefferson, and Max Weber: The Bureaucratic, Technologic Imperatives and the Future of the Healing Tradition in a Voluntary Society"
- 1986-87 (Michigan): Daniel Dennett—"The Moral First Aid Manual"
- 1986-87 (Oxford): Jon Elster—"Taming Chance: Randomization in Individual and Social Decisions"
- 1986-87 (Harvard): Jürgen Habermas—"Law and Morality"
- 1986-87 (Stanford): Gisela Striker—"Greek Ethics and Moral Theory"
- 1986-87 (Utah): Laurence H. Tribe—"On Reading the Constitution"
- 1987-88 (Cambridge): Louis Blom-Cooper—"The Penalty of Imprisonment"
- 1987-88 (Harvard): Robert A. Dahl—"The Pseudodemocratization of the American Presidency"
- 1987-88 (California): William Theodore de Bary—"The Trouble with Confucianism"
- 1987-88 (Michigan): Albert Hirschman—"Two Hundred Years of Reactionary Rhetoric: The Case of the Perverse Effect"
- 1987-88 (Madrid): Javier Muguerza—"The Alternative of Dissent"
- 1987-88 (Warsaw): Lord Quinton—"The Varieties of Value"
- 1987-88 (Oxford): Frederik van Zyl Slabbert—"The Dynamics of Reform and Revolt in Current South Africa"
- 1987-88 (Buenos Aires): Barry Stroud—"The Study of Human Nature and the Subjectivity of Value"
- 1988-89 (California): S. N. Eisenstadt—"Cultural Tradition, Historical Experience, and Social Change: The Limits of Convergence"
- 1988-89 (Chinese University): Fei Xiaotong—"Plurality and Unity in the Configuration of the Chinese People"
- 1988-89 (Stanford): Stephen J. Gould—"Challenges to Neo-Darwinism and Their Meaning for a Revised View of Human Consciousness"
- 1988-89 (Cambridge): Albert Hourani—"Islam in European Thought"
- 1988-89 (Michigan): Toni Morrison—"Unspeakable Things Unspoken: The Afro-American Presence in American Literature"
- 1988-89 (Yale): John G. A. Pocock—"Edward Gibbon in History: Aspects of the Text in The History of the Decline and Fall of the Roman Empire"
- 1988-89 (Utah): Judith N. Shklar—"American Citizenship: The Quest for Inclusion"
- 1988-89 (Oxford): Michael Walzer—"Nation and Universe"
- 1989-90 (Cambridge): Umberto Eco—"Interpretation and Overinterpretation: World, History, Texts"
- 1989-90 (Harvard): Ernest Gellner—"The Civil and the Sacred"
- 1989-90 (Michigan): Carol Gilligan—"Joining the Resistance:Psychology, Politics, Girls, and Women"
- 1989-90 (Princeton): Irving Howe—"The Self and the State"
- 1989-90 (Stanford): János Kornai—"I. Market Socialism Revisited" and "II. The Soviet Union's Road to a Free Economy: Comments of an Outside Observer"
- 1989-90 (Oxford): Bernard Lewis—"Europe and Islam"
- 1989-90 (Yale): Edward Nicolae Luttwak—"Strategy: A New Era?"
- 1989-90 (Utah): Octavio Paz—"Poetry and Modernity"
- 1990-91 (Princeton): Annette Baier—"Trust"
- 1990-91 (Cambridge): Gro Harlem Brundtland—"Environmental Challenges of the 1990s: Our Responsibility toward Future Generations"
- 1990-91 (Stanford) G.A. Cohen—"Incentives, Inequality, and Community"
- 1990-91 (Yale): Robertson Davies—"Reading and Writing"
- 1990-91 (Oxford): David N. Montgomery—"Citizenship and Justice in the Lives and Thoughts of Nineteenth-Century American Workers"
- 1990-91 (Michigan): Richard Rorty—"Feminism and Pragmatism"
- 1991-92 (Cambridge): David Baltimore—"On Doing Science in the Modern World"
- 1991-92 (Utah): Jared Diamond—"The Broadest Pattern of Human History"
- 1991-92 (Michigan): Christopher Hill—"The Bible in Seventeenth-Century English Politics"
- 1991-92 (UC Berkeley): Helmut Kohl
- 1991-92 (Princeton): Robert Nozick—"Decisions of Principle, Principles of Decision"
- 1991-92 (Oxford): Roald Sagdeev—"Science and Revolutions"
- 1991-92 (Stanford): Charles Taylor—"Modernity and the Rise of the Public Sphere"
- 1992-93 (Princeton): Stanley Hoffmann—"The Nation, Nationalism, and After: The Case of France"
- 1992-93 (Utah): Evelyn Fox Keller—"Rethinking the Meaning of Genetic Determinism"
- 1992-93 (Cambridge): Christine Korsgaard—"The Sources of Normativity"
- 1992-93 (Yale): Fritz Stern—"I. Mendacity Enforced: Europe, 1914-1989" and "II. Freedom and Its Discontents: Postunification Germany"
- 1993-94 (UC San Diego): K. Anthony Appiah—"Race, Culture, Identity: Misunderstood Connections"
- 1993-94 (UC Berkeley): Oscar Arias Sanchez—"Poverty: The New International Enemy"
- 1993-94 (Cambridge): Peter Brown—"Aspects of the Christianisation of the Roman World"
- 1993-94 (Stanford): Thomas E. Hill Jr.—"Respect for Humanity"
- 1993-94 (Utah): A.E. Dick Howard—"Toward the Open Society in Central and Eastern Europe"
- 1993-94 (Utah): Jeffrey Sachs—"Shock Therapy in Poland: Perspectives of Five Years"
- 1993-94 (Oxford): Gordon Slynn—"Law and Culture – A European Setting"
- 1993-94 (Harvard): Lawrence Stone—"Family Values in a Historical Perspective"
- 1993-94 (Michigan): William Julius Wilson—"The New Urban Poverty and the Problem of Race"
- 1994-95 (Stanford): Amy Gutmann—"Responding to Racial Injustice"
- 1994-95 (Princeton): Alasdair MacIntyre—"Truthfulness, Lies, and Moral Philosophers: What Can We Learn from Mill and Kant?"
- 1994-95 (Cambridge): Sir Roger Penrose—"Space-time and Cosmology"
- 1994-95 (Yale): Richard Posner—"Euthanasia and Health Care: Two Essays on the Policy Dilemmas of Aging and Old Age"
- 1995 (Princeton) Antonin Scalia—"Common-law Courts in a Civil-Law System: The Role of the United States Federal Courts in Interpreting the Constitution and Laws"
- 1994-95 (Harvard): Cass R. Sunstein—"Political Conflict and Legal Agreement"
- 1994-95 (Oxford): Janet Suzman—"Who Needs Parables?"
- 1995-96 (Princeton): Harold Bloom—"I. Shakespeare and the Value of Personality" and "II . Shakespeare and the Value of Love"
- 1995-96 (Yale): Peter Brown—"The End of the Ancient Other World: Death and Afterlife between Late Antiquity and the Early Middle Ages"
- 1995-96 (Stanford): Nancy Fraser—"Social Justice in the Age of Identity Politics: Redistribution, Recognition, and Participation"
- 1995-96 (UC Riverside): Mairead Corrigan Maguire—"Peacemaking from the Grassroots in a World of Ethnic Conflict"
- 1995-96 (Harvard): Onora O'Neill—"Kant on Reason and Religion"
- 1995-96 (Cambridge): Gunther Schuller—"I. Jazz: A Historical Perspective", "II. Duke Ellington" and "III. Charles Mingus"
- 1996-97 (Cambridge): Dorothy Cheney—"Why Animals Don't Have Language"
- 1996-97 (UC San Francisco): Marian Wright Edelman—"Standing for Children"
- 1996-97 (Oxford): Francis Fukuyama—"Social Capital"
- 1996-97 (Toronto): Peter Gay—"The Living Enlightenment"
- 1996-97 (Harvard): Stuart Hampshire—"Justice Is Conflict: The Soul and the City"
- 1996-97 (Stanford): Barbara Herman—"Moral Literacy"
- 1996-97 (Yale): Liam Hudson—"The Life of the Mind"
- 1996-97 (Utah): Elaine Pagels—"The Origin of Satan in Christian Tradition"
- 1996-97 (Michigan): T. M. Scanlon—"The Status of Well-Being"
- 1996-97 (Princeton): Robert Solow—"Welfare and Work"
- 1997-98 (Prague): Timothy Garton Ash—"The Direction of European History"
- 1997-98 (Harvard): Myles Burnyeat—"Culture and Society in Plato's Republic"
- 1997-98 (Princeton) J. M. Coetzee "The Lives of Animals"
- 1997-98 (Michigan): Antonio Damasio—"Exploring the Minded Brain"
- 1997-98 (Stanford): Arthur Kleinman—"Experience and Its Moral Modes: Culture, Human Conditions, and Disorder"
- 1997-98 (Oxford): Michael Sandel—"What Money Can't Buy: The Moral Limits of Markets"
- 1997-98 (Yale): Elaine Scarry—"On Beauty and Being Just"
- 1997-98 (Utah): Jonathan Spence—"Ideas of Power: China's Empire in the Eighteenth Century and Today"
- 1997-98 (Cambridge): Stephen Toulmin—"The Idol of Stability"
- 1998-99 (Michigan): Walter Burkert—"Revealing Nature amidst Multiple Cultures: A Discourse with Ancient Greeks"
- 1998-99 (Utah): Geoffrey Hartman—"Text and Spirit"
- 1998-99 (Yale): Steven Pinker—"The Blank Slate, the Noble Savage, and the Ghost in the Machine"
- 1998-99 (Princeton): Judith Jarvis Thomson—"Goodness and Advice"
- 1998-99 (Oxford): Sidney Verba—"Representative Democracy and Democratic Citizens: Philosophical and Empirical Understandings"
- 1998-99 (UC Davis): Richard White—"The Problem with Purity"
- 1999-2000 (Stanford): Jared Diamond—"Ecological Collapses of Pre-industrial Societies"
- 1999-2000 (Oxford): Geoffrey Hill—"Rhetorics of Value"
- 1999-2000 (Princeton): Michael Ignatieff—"I. Human Rights as Politics" and "II. Human Rights as Idolatry"
- 1999-2000 (Cambridge): Jonathan Lear—"Happiness"
- 1999-2000 (Harvard): Wolf Lepenies—"The End of "German Culture""
- 1999-2000 (UC Santa Barbara): William C. Richardson—"Reconceiving Health Care to Improve Quality"
- 1999-2000 (Utah): Charles Rosen—"Tradition without Convention: The Impossible Nineteenth-Century Project"
- 1999-2000 (Michigan): Helen Vendler—"Poetry and the Mediation of Value: Whitman on Lincoln"
- 1999-2000 (Yale): Marina Warner—"Spirit Visions"
- 2000-01 (Cambridge) K. Anthony Appiah—"The State and the Shaping of Identity"
- 2001 (Michigan): Michael Fried—"Roger Fry's Formalism"
- 2000-01 (Michigan): Partha Dasgupta
- 2000-01 (Utah): Sarah Hrdy—"The Past, Present, and Future of the Human Family"
- 2000-01 (Yale): Alexander Nehamas—"A Promise of Happiness: The Place of Beauty in a World of Art"
- 2000-01 (Princeton): Robert Pinsky—"American Culture and the Voice of Poetry"
- 2000–01 (Berkeley): Joseph Raz—The Practice of Value
- 2000-01 (Harvard): Simon Schama
- 2001 (Stanford): Dorothy Allison—"I. Mean Stories and Stubborn Girls" and "II. What It Means to Be Free"
- 2001 (Oxford): Sydney Kentridge—"Human Rights: A Sense of Proportion"
- 2001-02 (Harvard): Kathleen Sullivan
- 2001 (UC Berkeley): Sir Frank Kermode—"Pleasure, Change, and the Canon"
- 2002 (Utah): Benjamin R. Barber—"Democratic Alternatives to the Mullahs and the Malls"
- 2002 (Princeton): T. J. Clark—"Painting at Ground Level"
- 2002 (Harvard): Lorraine Daston—"I. The Morality of Natural Orders" and "II. Nature's Customs vs. Nature's Laws"
- 2002 (UC Berkeley): Derek Parfit—"What We Could Rationally Will"
- 2002 (Yale): Salman Rushdie—"Step Across This Line"
- 2002 (Oxford): Laurence H. Tribe—"The Constitution in Crisis"
- 2003 (Harvard): Richard Dawkins—"I. The Science of Religion" and "II. The Religion of Science"
- 2003 (Princeton): Frans de Waal—"Morality and the Social Instincts"
- 2003 (Princeton): Jonathan Glover—"Towards Humanism in Psychiatry"
- 2003 (Oxford): David M. Kennedy—"The Dilemma of Difference in Democratic Society"
- 2003 (Cambridge): Martha C. Nussbaum—"Beyond the Social Contract: Toward Global Justice"
- 2003 (Stanford): Mary Robinson—"I. Human Rights and Ethical Globalization" and "II. The Challenge of Human Rights Protection in Africa"
- 2003 (Yale): Garry Wills—"Henry Adams: The Historian as a Novelist"
- 2004 (Berkeley): Seyla Benhabib—"Reclaiming Universalism: Negotiating Republican Self-Determinism and Cosmopolitan Norms"
- 2004 (Harvard): Stephen Breyer—"Active Liberty: Interpreting Our Democratic Constitution"
- 2004 (Stanford): Harry Frankfurt—"I. Taking Ourselves Seriously" and "II. Getting it Right"
- 2004 (Michigan): Christine Korsgaard—"Fellow Creatures: Kantian Ethics and Our Duties to Animals"
- 2005 (Cambridge): Carl Bildt—"Peace After War: Our Experience"
- 2005 (University of Utah) Paul Farmer—"Never Again? Reflections on Human Values and Human Rights"
- 2005 (UC Berkeley): Axel Honneth—"Reification: A Recognition-Theoretical View"
- 2005 (Stanford): Avishai Margalit—"I. Indecent Compromise" and "II. Decent Peace"
- 2005 (Yale): Ruth Reichl—"Why Food Matters"
- 2005 (Michigan): Marshall Sahlins—"Hierarchy, Equality, and the Sublimation of Anarchy: the Western Illusion of Human Nature"
- 2005 (Harvard): James Q. Wilson—"I. Politics and Polarization" and "II. Religion and Polarization"
- 2006 (Stanford): David Brion Davis—"Exiles, Exodus, and Promised Lands"
- 2006 (UC Berkeley): Allan Gibbard—"Thinking How to Live with Each Other"
- 2006 (Utah): Margaret H. Marshall—"Tension and Intentions: The American Constitutions and the Shaping of Democracies Abroad"
- 2007 (Cambridge): Judy Illes—"Medicine, Neruoscience, Ethics, and Society"
- 2007 (Michigan): Brian Skyrms—"Evolution and the Social Contract"
- 2007 (Utah): Bill Viola—"Presence and Absence"
- 2007 (Princeton): Susan Wolf—"Meaning in Life and Why It Matters"
- 2008 (Utah): Howard Gardner—"What is Good Work? Achieving Good Work in Turbulent Times"
- 2008 (Princeton): Marc Hauser—"The Seeds of Humanity"
- 2008 (Cambridge): Lisa Jardine—"What's Left of Culture and Society?"
- 2008 (Tsinghua University): David Miller—"Global Justice and Climate Change: How Should Responsibilities Be Distributed?"
- 2008 (Harvard): Sari Nusseibeh—"Philosophical Reflections on the Israeli-Palestinian War"
- 2008 (Berkeley): Annabel Patterson—"Pandors's Boxes"
- 2008 (Stanford): Michael Tomasello—"Origins of Human Cooperation"
- 2009 (Yale University): John Adams—"Doctor Atomic and His Gadget"
- 2009 (University of Utah): Isabel Allende—"In the Hearts of Women"
- 2009 (Cambridge): Sir Christopher Frayling—"Art and Religion in the Modern West: Some Perspectives"
- 2009 (Harvard): Jonathan Lear—"To Become Human Does Not Come That Easily"
- 2009 (UC Berkeley): Jeremy Waldron—"Dignity, Rank and Rights"
- 2009 (Stanford): Roberto Mangabeira Unger-"The Future of Religion and the Religion of the Future"
- 2010 (Princeton University): Bruce Ackerman—"The Decline and Fall of the American Republic"
- 2010 (UC Berkeley): Abdullahi Ahmed An-Na'im—"Transcending Imperialism: Human Values and Global Citizenship"
- 2010 (Stanford): Mark Danner—"Torture and the Forever War"
- 2010 (Utah): Spike Lee—"America through My Lens: The Evolving Nature of Race and Class in the Films of Spike Lee"
- 2010 (Michigan): Susan Neiman—"Victims and Heroes"
- 2010 (Princeton): Robert Putnam—"American Grace"
- 2010 (Oxford): Ahmed Rashid—"Afghanistan and Pakistan: Past Mistakes, Future Directions?"
- 2010 (Michigan): Martin Seligman—"Flourish: Positive Psychology and Positive Interventions"
- 2010 (Cambridge): Susan J. Smith—"Care-full Markets: Miracle or Mirage?"
- 2011-12 (Michigan): John Broome—"The Public and Private Morality of Climate Change"
- 2011-12 (Stanford): John M. Cooper—"Ancient Philosophies as a Way of Life"
- 2011-12 (Harvard): Esther Duflo—"Human Values and the Design of the Fight against Poverty"
- 2011-12 (Cambridge): Ernst Fehr—"The Psychology and Economics of Authority"
- 2011-12 (Princeton): Stephen Greenblatt—"Shakespeare and the Shape of a Life: The Uses of Life Stories"
- 2011-12 (Yale): Lisa Jardine—"The Two Cultures: Still Under Consideration"
- 2011 (Yale): Rebecca Newberger Goldstein—"The Ancient Quarrel: Philosophy and Literature" and "The Ancient Quarrel: Philosophy and Literature,"
- 2011 (Stanford): Elinor Ostrom—"I. Frameworks" and "II. Analyzing One-Hundred-Year-Old Irrigation Puzzles"
- 2011 (Harvard): James Scott—"Four Domestications: Fire, Plants, Animals, and... Us"
- 2011–12 (Berkeley): Samuel Scheffler—"The Afterlife: I. How People Who Don't Yet Exist Matter More to Us than People Who Do and II. How the Present Depends the Future"
- 2011-12 (Utah): Abraham Verghese—"Two Souls Intertwined"
- 2011-12 (Brasenose College, Oxford): Diane Coyle—"The Public Responsibility of the Economist"
- 2012-13 (Linacre College, Oxford): Michael Ignatieff—"Representation and Responsibility: Ethics and Public Office"
- 2012-13 (Berkeley): Frances Kamm—"I. Who Turned the Trolley?" and "II. How Was the Trolley Turned?"
- 2012-13 (Cambridge): Joseph Koerner—"The Viennese Interior: Architecture & Inwardness"
- 2012-13 (Paris, France): Claude Lanzmann—"Resurrections"
- 2012-13 (Princeton): Ian Morris—"Human Values in the Very Long Run"
- 2012-13 (Harvard): Robert Post—"Representative Democracy: The Constitutional Theory of Campaign Finance Reform"
- 2012-13 (Utah): Michael J. Sandel—"The Moral Economy of Speculation: Gambling, Finance, and the Common Good"
- 2012-13 (Stanford): William Bowen—"I. Costs and Productivity in Higher Education" and "II. Prospects for an Online Fix: Can We Harness Technology in the Service of our Aspirations?"
- 2012-13 (Michigan): Craig Calhoun—"The Problematic Public: Revisiting Dewey, Arendt, and Habermas"
- 2013-14 (Linacre College, Oxford): Shami Chakrabarti—"Human Rights as Human Values"
- 2013-14 (Utah): Neil deGrasse Tyson—"Science as a Way of Knowing"
- 2013-14 (Yale): Paul Gilroy—"The Black Atlantic and the Re-enchantment of Humanism"
- 2013-14 (Yale): Bruno Latour—"How Better to Register the Agency of Things"
- 2013-14 (Stanford): Nicholas Lemann—"The Transaction Society: Origins and Consequences"
- 2013-14 (Michigan): Walter Mischel—"Overcoming the Weakness of the Will"
- 2013-14 (Cambridge): Philippe Sands—"The Great Crimes: The Quest for Justice Among Individuals and Groups"
- 2013-14 (UC Berkeley): Eric Santner—"The Weight of All Flesh: On the Subject Matter of Political Economy"
- 2013-14 (Utah): Andrew Solomon—"Love, Acceptance, Celebration: How Parents Make Their Children"
- 2013-14 (Harvard): Archbishop Rowan Williams–"The Paradox of Empathy"
- 2014-15 (Stanford): Danielle Allen—"Education and Equality"
- 2014-15 (Princeton): Elizabeth Anderson—"I. Private Government" and "II. When the Market Was 'Left'"
- 2014-15 (Utah ): Margaret Atwood—"Human Values in Age of Change"
- 2014-15 (Yale): Dipesh Chakrabarty—"The Human Condition of the Anthropocene"
- 2014-15 (Cambridge): Peter Galison—"Science, Secrecy and the Private Self"
- 2014-15 (Michigan): Ruth Bader Ginsburg—"A Conversation with Ruth Bader Ginsburg"
- 2014-15 (Harvard): Carlo Ginzburg—"Casuistry, For and Against: Pascal's Provinciales and Their Aftermath"
- 2014-15 (UC Berkeley): Philip Pettit—"I. From Language to Commitment" and "II. From Commitment to Responsibility"
- 2014-15 (Linacre College, Oxford): Peter Singer—"From Moral Neutrality to Effective Altruism: The Changing Scope and Significance of Moral Philosophy"
- 2015-16 (Stanford): Andrew Bacevich—"The American Military Encounters Islam"
- 2015-16 (Michigan): Abhijit Banerjee—""What do Economists Do?""
- 2015-16 (Ochanomizu): Dame Carol Black—"Women: Education, Biology, Power, and Leadership"
- 2015-16 (Princeton): Robert Boyd—"I. Not by Brains Alone: The vital role of culture in human adaptation" and "II. Beyond Kith and Kin: How culture transformed human cooperation"
- 2015-16 (Yale): Judith Butler—"Interpreting Non-Violence"
- 2015-16 (Berkeley): Didier Fassin—"The Will to Punish"
- 2015-16 (Clare Hall, Cambridge): Derek Gregory—"Reach for the Sky: Aerial Violence and the Everywhere War"
- 2015-16 (Utah): Siddhartha Mukherjee—""The Gene: An Intimate History""
- 2015-16 (Linacre College, Oxford): Shirley Williams—"The Value of Europe and European Values"
- 2016 (Princeton): Naomi Oreskes - Lecture I: "Trust in Science?" - Lecture II: "When Not to Trust Science, or When Science Goes Awry"
- 2016-17 (Berkeley): Seana Shiffrin—"I. Democratic Law" and "II. Common and Constitutional Law: A Democratic Legal Perspective"
- 2016-17 (Linacre College, Oxford): George F. R. Ellis—"On the Origin and Nature of Values"
- 2017 (Harvard): Bryan Stevenson—"Social Justice Action: How We Change the World"
- 2017-18 (Berkeley): Michael Warner–"Environmental Care and the Infrastructure of Indifference"
- 2017-18 (Linacre College, Oxford): Abhijit Banerjee and Esther Duflo—"Economics for the Human Race"
- 2018 (Harvard): Dorothy E. Roberts–"The Old Biosocial and the Legacy of Unethical Science" and "The New Biosocial and The Future of Ethical Science"
- 2018-19 (Linacre College, Oxford): Strobe Talbott—"A President for Dark Times: The Age of Reason Meets the Age of Trump"
- 2019 (Harvard): Masha Gessen—"How We Think About Migration" and "Some Ideas for Talking About Migration"
- 2019-20 (Michigan): Charles W. Mills—"Theorizing Racial Justice"
- 2021-22 (Princeton): Elizabeth Kolbert—"Welcome to the Anthropocene: Lecture II - What Can We Do About It?" and "Welcome to the Anthropocene: Lecture I - What on Earth Have We Done?"
- 2023 (Harvard): Margaret Hiza Redsteer –"On Resilience: A Capacity to Absorb Disturbances and Shocks" and "Barriers to Transforming Climate Dialogues"
- 2023-24 (Yale): Rob Nixon –"Ecology and Equity"
- 2024 (Harvard): Hahrie Han –"Stories of Democracy Realized"
- 2024-25 (Linacre College, Oxford): Volker Turk—"Cooling a Planet on Fire"
- 2025-26 (Linacre College, Oxford): Yuval Noah Harari—"AI bureaucrats, AI religions, and AI boyfriends: What happens when a non-human intelligence hacks the operating system of civilisation"
