= Sextus Empiricus =

2nd-century Roman philosopher and physician

- Title page of a Latin edition of Sextus Empiricus’s Against the Professors; there are no surviving portraits of the philosopher.
- Born: Second century CE
- Died: Late 2nd century or early 3rd century possibly in Alexandria or Rome

Philosophical work
- Era: Hellenistic philosophy
- Region: Western philosophy
- School: Pyrrhonism; Empiric school
- Main interests: Skepticism
- Notable works: Outlines of Pyrrhonism; Against the Dogmatists; Against the Professors

Sextus Empiricus (Ancient Greek: Σέξτος Ἐμπειρικός, Sextos Empeirikos; fl. mid-late 2nd century CE) was a Greek Pyrrhonist philosopher and Empiric school physician with Roman citizenship. His philosophical works are the most complete surviving account of ancient Greek and Roman Pyrrhonism, and because of the arguments they contain against the other Hellenistic philosophies, they are also a major source of information about those philosophies.

== Life ==
Little is known about Sextus Empiricus. He likely lived in Alexandria, Rome, or Athens. His Roman name, Sextus, implies he was a Roman citizen. The Suda, a 10th-century Byzantine encyclopedia, states that he was the same person as Sextus of Chaeronea, as do other pre-modern sources, but this identification is commonly doubted. In his medical work, as reflected by his name, tradition maintains that he belonged to the Empiric school in which Pyrrhonism was popular. However, at least twice in his writings, Sextus seems to place himself closer to the Methodic school.

== Philosophy ==
As a skeptic, Sextus Empiricus raised concerns which applied to all types of knowledge. He doubted the validity of induction long before its best known critic, David Hume, and raised the regress argument against all forms of reasoning:

Those who claim for themselves to judge the truth are bound to possess a criterion of truth. This criterion, then, either is without a judge's approval or has been approved. But if it is without approval, whence comes it that it is trustworthy? For no matter of dispute is to be trusted without judging. And, if it has been approved, that which approves it, in turn, either has been approved or has not been approved, and so on ad infinitum.

This view is known as Pyrrhonian skepticism, which Sextus differentiated from Academic skepticism as practiced by Carneades which, according to Sextus, denies the possibility of knowledge altogether, something that Sextus criticized as being an affirmative belief. Instead, Sextus advocates simply giving up belief; in other words, suspending judgment (epoché) about whether or not anything is knowable. Only by suspending judgment can we attain a state of ataraxia (roughly, 'peace of mind').

There is some debate as to the extent to which Sextus advocated the suspension of judgement. According to Myles Burnyeat, Jonathan Barnes, and Benson Mates, Sextus advises that we should suspend judgment about virtually all beliefs; that is to say, we should neither affirm any belief as true nor deny any belief as false, since we may live without any beliefs, acting by habit. Michael Frede, however, defends a different interpretation, according to Sextus, beliefs are permissible so long as they are not grounded in reason, philosophy, or speculation; a skeptic may, for instance, accept commonly held views within their society. The key distinction between the skeptic and the dogmatist lies in the source of belief: the skeptic does not arrive at beliefs through rigorous philosophical inquiry.

== Writings ==
Diogenes Laërtius and the Suda report that Sextus Empiricus wrote ten books on Pyrrhonism; the Suda also records a work titled Ethica. The three works of Sextus that survive in Greek are the Outlines of Pyrrhonism (Πυῤῥώνειοι ὑποτυπώσεις, Pyrrhōneioi hypotypōseis, commonly abbreviated PH) and two collections preserved under the common title Adversus Mathematicos (Πρὸς μαθηματικούς, Pros mathematikous, commonly abbreviated AM or M).

The surviving portion of Adversus Mathematicos is fragmentary and evidently incomplete: the text itself refers to parts that are missing and to other works of Sextus that do not survive, including Medical Commentaries (AM I 202), Empirical Commentaries (AM I 62), and Commentaries on the Soul (AM IV 284; AM VI 55).

The portion of AM that is securely preserved in the manuscripts corresponds to six books (often printed and discussed together as AM I–VI). These six books are traditionally titled and are commonly referred to in English collectively as "Against the Professors" (though only the heading Pros mathematikous and the title of the Outlines appear in the manuscripts themselves).

Book	English title	Greek title
I	Against the Grammarians	Πρὸς γραμματικούς / Pros grammatikous
II	Against the Rhetoricians	Πρὸς ῥητορικούς / Pros rhetorikous
III	Against the Geometers	Πρὸς γεωμετρικούς / Pros geometrikous
IV	Against the Arithmeticians	Πρὸς ἀριθμητικούς / Pros arithmetikous
V	Against the Astrologers	Πρὸς ἀστρολόγους / Pros astrologous
VI	Against the Musicians	Πρὸς μουσικούς / Pros mousikous

Beyond these six books, a further set of books preserved in some manuscript traditions has been transmitted under the same overall heading Adversus Mathematicos and in modern scholarship is frequently distinguished from AM I–VI. These later books (often numbered VII–XI in printed editions) are sometimes grouped under the separate title Against the Dogmatists (Πρὸς δογματικούς, Pros dogmatikous) or treated as parts of a larger, now‑partially lost collection often called Skeptical Treatises (Σκεπτικὰ Ὑπομνήματα, Skeptika Hypomnēmata). It is generally accepted that what survives of these later books is fragmentary and that their original relationship to the first six books and to the lost portions cannot be securely reconstructed.

Book	English title	Greek title
VII–VIII	Against the Logicians	Πρὸς λογικούς / Pros logikous
IX–X	Against the Physicists	Πρὸς φυσικούς / Pros physikous
XI	Against the Ethicists	Πρὸς ἠθικούς / Pros ethikous

In short: AM I–VI are the core books commonly printed and cited as Adversus Mathematicos (often called "Against the Professors"); the additional books transmitted as AM VII–XI are preserved in a more fragmentary state, are frequently treated as a separate or later section (sometimes titled Against the Dogmatists), and their original completeness and relation to the first six books remain uncertain.

== Legacy ==
An influential Latin translation of Sextus's Outlines was published by Henricus Stephanus in Geneva in 1562, and this was followed by a complete Latin Sextus with Gentian Hervet as translator in 1569. Petrus and Jacobus Chouet published the Greek text for the first time in 1621. Stephanus did not publish it with his Latin translation either in 1562 or in 1569, nor was it published in the reprint of the latter in 1619.

Sextus's Outlines were widely read in Europe during the 16th, 17th and 18th centuries, and had a profound effect on Michel de Montaigne, David Hume and Georg Wilhelm Friedrich Hegel, among many others. Another source for the circulation of Sextus's ideas was Pierre Bayle's Dictionary. Since the Renaissance, French philosophy has been continuously influenced by Sextus: Montaigne in the 16th century, Descartes, Blaise Pascal, Pierre-Daniel Huet and François de La Mothe Le Vayer in the 17th century, many of the "Philosophes", and in recent times controversial figures such as Michel Onfray, in a direct line of filiation between Sextus's radical skepticism and secular or even radical atheism.

== Works ==
=== Translations ===
Old complete translation in four volumes

- Sextus Empiricus, Sextus Empiricus I: Outlines of Pyrrhonism. R.G. Bury (trans.) (Cambridge, Massachusetts: Harvard University Press, 1933/2000). ISBN 0-674-99301-2
- Sextus Empiricus, Sextus Empiricus II: Against the Logicians. R.G. Bury (trans.) (Cambridge, Massachusetts: Harvard University Press, 1935/1997). ISBN 0-674-99321-7
- Sextus Empiricus, Sextus Empiricus III: Against the Physicists, Against the Ethicists. R.G. Bury (trans.) Cambridge, Massachusetts: Harvard University Press, 1936/1997. ISBN 0-674-99344-6
- Sextus Empiricus, Sextus Empiricus IV: Against the Professors. R.G. Bury (trans.) (Cambridge, Massachusetts: Harvard University Press, 1949/2000). ISBN 0-674-99420-5

New partial translations

- Sextus Empiricus, Against the Grammarians (Adversos Mathematicos I) David Blank (trans.) Oxford: Clarendon Press, 1998. ISBN 0-19-824470-3
- Sextus Empiricus, Against the Mathematicians (Adversos Mathematicos IV) Lorenzo Corti (trans.) Leiden: Brill, 2024. ISBN 978-90-04-67949-8
- Sextus Empiricus, Against those in the Disciplines (Adversos Mathematicos I-VI). Richard Bett (trans.) (New York: Oxford University Press 2018). ISBN 9780198712701
- Sextus Empiricus, Against the Logicians. (Adversus Mathematicos VII and VIII). Richard Bett (trans.) Cambridge: Cambridge University Press, 2005. ISBN 0-521-53195-0
- Sextus Empiricus, Against the Physicists (Adversus Mathematicos IX and X). Richard Bett (trans.) Cambridge: Cambridge University Press, 2012. ISBN 0-521-51391-X
- Sextus Empiricus, Against the Ethicists (Adversus Mathematicos XI). Richard Bett (trans.) (Oxford: Oxford University Press, 1997). ISBN 0-19-823620-4
- Sextus Empiricus, Against the Musicians. A new critical text and translation on facing pages, with an introduction, annotation, and indices verborum and nominum et rerum by Denise Davidson Greaves (Lincoln: University of Nebraska Press, 1986). ISBN 0-8032-4168-2
- Sextus Empiricus, Outlines of Scepticism. Julia Annas and Jonathan Barnes (trans.) (Cambridge: Cambridge University Press, 2nd ed. 2000). ISBN 0-521-77809-3
- Sextus Empiricus, The Skeptic Way: Sextus Empiricus's Outlines of Pyrrhonism. Benson Mates (trans.) Oxford: Oxford University Press, 1996. ISBN 0-19-509213-9
- Sextus Empiricus, Selections from the Major Writings on Skepticism Man and God. Sanford G. Etheridge (trans.) Indianapolis: Hackett, 1985. ISBN 0-87220-006-X

French translations

- Sextus Empiricus, Contre les Professeurs (the first six treatises), Greek text and French Translation, under the editorship of Pierre Pellegrin (Paris: Seuil-Points, 2002). ISBN 2-02-048521-4
- Sextus Empiricus, Esquisses Pyrrhoniennes, Greek text and French Translation, under the editorship of Pierre Pellegrin (Paris: Seuil-Points, 1997).

Old editions

- Sexti Empirici Adversus mathematicos, hoc est, adversus eos qui profitentur disciplinas, Gentiano Herveto Aurelio interprete, Parisiis, M. Javenem, 1569 (Vicifons).

== See also ==
- Philosophical skepticism
- Protagoras
- Dissoi Logoi

== Bibliography ==
- Annas, Julia and Barnes, Jonathan, The Modes of Scepticism: Ancient Texts and Modern Interpretations, Cambridge: Cambridge University Press, 1985. ISBN 0-521-27644-6
- Bailey, Alan, Sextus Empiricus and Pyrrhonean scepticism, Oxford: Oxford University Press, 2002. ISBN 0-19-823852-5
- Berry, Jessica (2011). Nietzsche and the Ancient Skeptical Tradition. Oxford University Press. p. 230. ISBN 978-0-19-536842-0.
- Bett, Richard, Pyrrho, His Antecedents, and His Legacy, Oxford: Oxford University Press, 2000. ISBN 0-19-925661-6
- Breker, Christian, Einführender Kommentar zu Sextus Empiricus' "Grundriss der pyrrhonischen Skepsis", Mainz, 2011: electr. publication, University of Mainz. available online Archived 2022-01-12 at the Wayback Machine (comment on Sextus Empiricus' "Outlines of Pyrrhonism" in German language)
- Brennan, Tad, Ethics and Epistemology in Sextus Empiricus, London: Garland, 1999. ISBN 0-8153-3659-4
- Brochard, Victor, Les Sceptiques grecs (1887) reprint Paris: Librairie générale française, 2002.
- Burnyeat, Myles and Frede, Michael The Original Sceptics: A Controversy, Hackett: Indianapolis, 1997. ISBN 0-87220-347-6
- Floridi, Luciano, Sextus Empiricus: the Transmission and Recovery of Pyrrhonism, Oxford: Oxford University Press, 2002. ISBN 0-19-514671-9
- Hankinson, R.J., The Sceptics, London: Routledge, 1998. ISBN 0-415-18446-0
- Hookway, C., Scepticism, London: Routledge, 1992. ISBN 0-415-08764-3
- Jourdain, Charles, Sextus Empiricus et la philosophie scholastique, Paris: Paul Dupont, 1858.
- Janáček, Karel, Sexti Empirici indices, Firenze: Olschki, 2000.
- Janáček, Karel, Studien zu Sextus Empiricus, Diogenes Laertius und zur pyrrhonischen Skepsis. Hrsg. v. Jan Janda / Filip Karfík (= Beiträge zur Altertumskunde; Bd. 249), Berlin: de Gruyter 2008.
- Mates, Benson, The Skeptic Way: Sextus Empiricus's Outlines of Pyrrhonism, Oxford: Oxford University Press, 1996.
- Pappenheim Eugen, Lebensverhältnisse des Sextus Empiricus, Berlin, Nauck, 1875.
- Perin, Casey, The Demands of Reason: An Essay on Pyrrhonian Scepticism, Oxford: Oxford University Press, 2010.
- Popkin, Richard, The History of Scepticism: From Savonarola to Bayle, Oxford: Oxford University Press, 2003. ISBN 0-19-510768-3
- Vazquez, Daniel, Reason in Check: the Skepticism of Sextus Empiricus, Hermathena, 186, 2009, pp. 43–57.
