= Michael N. Forster =

American philosopher (born 1957)

- Born: Michael Neil Forster; December 9, 1957 (age 68)

Education
- Education: University of Oxford (BA); Princeton University (PhD)
- Thesis: Hegel and Skepticism (1987)
- Doctoral advisor: Raymond Geuss
- Other advisors: John M. Cooper; Michael Frede; Tim Scanlon; Ralph Walker

Philosophical work
- Era: Contemporary philosophy
- Region: Western philosophy
- School: Continental philosophy
- Institutions: University of Chicago; University of Bonn
- Notable students: Rachel Zuckert
- Main interests: Philosophy of language Hermeneutics

Michael Neil Forster (born December 9, 1957) is a British-American philosopher and the Alexander von Humboldt Professor, holder of the Chair in Theoretical Philosophy, and Co-director of the International Center for Philosophy at the University of Bonn, where he has taught since 2013. He is an expert on 18th- and 19th-century German philosophy, especially Herder and Hegel.

== Education and career ==
Forster earned his Ph.D. from Princeton University in 1987, where he worked with Raymond Geuss and Michael Frede. He became Assistant Professor of Philosophy and the College at the University of Chicago, rising to the rank of Glen A. Lloyd Distinguished Service Professor before moving to Bonn. He remains a visiting professor at Chicago.

== Books ==
- Herder's Philosophy (Oxford University Press, 2018)
- German Philosophy of Language from Schlegel to Hegel and Beyond (Oxford University Press, 2011)
- After Herder (Oxford University Press, 2010)
- Kant and Skepticism (Princeton University Press, 2008)
- Wittgenstein on the Arbitrariness of Grammar (Princeton University Press, 2004)
- Herder: Philosophical Writings (Ed., Cambridge University Press, 2002)
- Hegel's Idea of a "Phenomenology of Spirit" (University of Chicago Press, 1998)
- Hegel and Skepticism (Harvard University Press, 1989)
