= Margaret Hiza Redsteer =

Crow Nation geomorphologist and professor

Margaret Hiza Redsteer is a geomorphologist and professor at the University of Washington Bothell. She previously worked as a research scientist for the U.S Department of the Interior and the U.S Geological Survey. Redsteer's main research focuses on fixing the effects of climate change on the Navajo region by incorporating the knowledge of Native American elders in combination with scientific studies and procedures. She was a lead author of chapter 15, titled "Adaptation Planning and Implementation" in the Intergovernmental Panel on Climate Change (IPCC) Fifth Assessment Report, most likely making her the first Native American woman to hold such a role.

== Early life and education ==
Redsteer was raised in Story, Wyoming. Redsteer is of Crow Nation descent on her father's side and has a white mother. Redsteer moved to Colorado to become a silversmith, being trained to create Native American homemade jewelry. In Colorado, Redsteer met and married Robert Redsteer, a Navajo man with the dream of moving south to Robert's home in the Navajo Reservation.

In 1986, Redsteer, her husband, and three small children, were forced to relocate to Flagstaff, Arizona due to the 1974 Navajo Hopi Land Settlement Act. With only a high school diploma, job opportunities were limited in Flagstaff for Redsteer. However, while Redsteer and her family lived on the Navajo Reservation, she noticed the poor quality and limited access to water available those living on the reservation. After relocating to Flagstaff with her family, Redsteer continued her education in environmental science.

In Flagstaff, Redsteer began to study geology at Northern Arizona University in Flagstaff. By the time Redsteer finished her degree at Northern Arizona University, she and her husband separated. As a single-mother, Redsteer continued pursuing her education in graduate school. After winning a National Science Foundation Fellowship, Redsteer studied sedimentology at Montana State University, where she earned her master's degree in 1993. Redsteer's master's research in Yellowstone National Park was inspired by David Love, a Wyoming geologist who spent much of his career studying volcanic rocks in the area.

After 14 years, she earned a Ph.D in geochemistry from Oregon State University researching volcanic rocks. Redsteer's graduate advisor, Anita Grunder, was an inspiration for her due to providing an example of a good work-like balance for Redsteer.

== Career ==
Redsteer became a member of the U.S Geological Survey in the early 2000s. She studied volcanic deposits, but soon switched to studying climate change. Redsteer's research includes addressing water scarcity through different scientific methods. Her work as a research scientist faced the gender norm expectations of men and women of her time. Although academia remains a male-dominated profession, female scientists like Redsteer inspired girls to pursue science.

Redsteer studies the influence climate change has on water access and environmental degradation on tribal lands. Specifically, she examines Navajo and Hopi land as well as the Crow reservation where she was born. Redsteer uses her life experiences from living on a reservation and her scientific training to develop solutions for tribal communities with poor water access.

While collaborating with scientists, anthropologists, and translators, Redsteer and her team worked with Navajo tribal elders to document environmental changes happening on tribal lands. A documentary by the U.S. Geological Survey entitled "A Record of Change-Science and Elder Observations on the Navajo Nation" shows how Redsteer and her team used local and historical Navajo knowledge and scientific research to find solutions for communities with water shortages.

On April 12–13, 2023, Redsteer delivered the Tanner Lectures on Human Values at Harvard University. In these lectures, she addressed the need for greater focus on how climate change affects marginalized communities.
