= Richard Bett =

American philosopher

Richard Arnot Home Bett holds a joint appointment in Philosophy and Classics at Johns Hopkins University. He received his BA from Oxford University and his PhD from UC Berkeley. He spent 1994-5 as a Fellow at the Center for Hellenic Studies, Washington, D.C. From January 2000 to June 2001 he was Acting Executive Director of the American Philosophical Association, and he was Secretary-Treasurer of its Eastern Division from 2003 to 2013.

Professor Bett specializes in ancient Greek philosophy, and has strong interests in ancient and modern ethics and epistemology, as well as Nietzsche.

== Books ==
- Pyrrho, His Antecedents and His Legacy, Oxford University Press, 2000, ISBN 978-0-19-825065-4
- The Cambridge Companion to Ancient Scepticism, Editor Richard Bett, Cambridge University Press, 2010, ISBN 978-0-521-69754-5

== Articles ==
- “Aristocles on Timon on Pyrrho: The text, its logic, and its credibility.”, in Oxford Studies in Ancient Philosophy 15/1994, p. 137-181.
- “Reactions to Aristotle in the Greek Sceptical Traditions”, Méthexis: Revista Internacional de Filosofia Antigua XII (1999), p. 17-34.
- “What does Pyrrhonism have to do with Pyrrho?”, in Ancient Skepticism and the Skeptical Tradition: Acta Philosophica Fennica 66 (2000), p. 11-33.
- “On the Pre-History of Pyrrhonism”, Proceedings of the Boston Area Colloquium in Ancient Philosophy 15 (2000), p. 137-166.
- “Nietzsche on the Skeptics and Nietzsche as Skeptic”, Archiv für Geschichte der Philosophie 82 (2000), p. 62-86.

== Translations ==
- Against the Ethicists, Sextus Empiricus, Oxford University Press, 1997, ISBN 978-0-19-823620-7
- Against the Logicians, Sextus Empiricus, Cambridge University Press, 2005, ISBN 978-0-521-53195-5
- "Sextus Empiricus' Against the Physicists", Cambridge University Press, 2012, ISBN 052151391X, 9780521513913
