= Reginald Hackforth =

British classical scholar (1887–1957)

Reginald Hackforth FBA (17 August 1887 – 6 May 1957) was an English classical scholar, known mainly for his work on Plato, and from 1939 to 1952 was the second Laurence Professor of Ancient Philosophy at Cambridge University.

== Life ==
=== Early life ===
Hackforth was born in London. After attending Westminster, Hackforth went up to Trinity College, Cambridge, in 1907, graduating in 1909 with first class honours in both parts of the classical tripos. He was John Stewart of Rannoch Scholar in 1907, Davies scholar in 1908 and won the Chancellor's Medal in 1909.

=== Academic career ===
After a brief period lecturing at the University of Manchester (1910–12), Hackforth returned to Cambridge as a Fellow of Sidney Sussex College in 1912, a position he held for the remainder of his life. For many years he served as editor of the Classical Quarterly, winning the respect and friendship of J. D. Denniston and A. E. Housman.

Hackforth produced two chapters for the Cambridge Ancient History on the history of Sicily in part of the fifth and fourth centuries BC, which utilised his interpretation of the literary evidence of Pindar, Bacchylides and the Epistles of Plato.

Hackforth was elected a Fellow of the British Academy in 1946.

=== Personal ===
Hackforth was the younger son of J.P. Hackforth. In 1922 he married Lily Mines, daughter of H.R. Mines, H.M. Inspector of Schools, who was buried with him in the Parish of the Ascension Burial Ground in Cambridge after her own death in 1975.

Hackforth's Cambridge address was 4 Selwyn Gardens. He died in Cambridge, aged 69.

== Publications ==
- The Authorship of the Platonic Epistles. Manchester: Manchester University Press, 1913.
- The composition of Plato's Apology. Cambridge: Cambridge University Press, 1933.
- Plato's examination of pleasure: a translation of the Philebus with an introduction and commentary. Cambridge: Cambridge University Press, 1945
- Plato's Phaedrus: translated with an introduction and commentary. Cambridge: Cambridge University Press, 1952.
- Plato's Phaedo: translated with an introduction and commentary. Cambridge: Cambridge University Press, 1955.

Academic offices
Preceded by Francis Macdonald Cornford	Laurence Professor of Ancient Philosophy Cambridge University; 1939 - 1952	Succeeded by William Keith Chambers Guthrie
