= Julia Annas =

British philosopher (born 1946)

- Born: Julia Elizabeth Annas; 13 June 1946 (age 80)

Education
- Education: Oxford University; Harvard University
- Academic advisor: G. E. L. Owen

Philosophical work
- Era: Contemporary philosophy
- Region: Western philosophy
- School: Analytic philosophy Virtue ethics
- Institutions: St Hugh's College, Oxford; University of Arizona
- Main interests: Ethics

Julia Elizabeth Annas (born 1946) is a British philosopher who has taught in the United States for the last quarter-century. She is Regents Professor of Philosophy Emerita at the University of Arizona.

== Education and career ==
Annas graduated from Oxford University in 1968 with a B.A. and from Harvard University with an A.M. (1970) and a Ph.D. (1972). She was a Fellow and Tutor at St Hugh's College, Oxford, for fifteen years before joining the faculty at the University of Arizona in 1986, where she taught until her retirement, apart from one year as a professor at Columbia University.

She specializes in the study of ancient Greek philosophy, including ethics, psychology, and epistemology. She is the founder and former editor of the annual journal Oxford Studies in Ancient Philosophy. She is married to Hume scholar David Owen, also a professor of philosophy at the University of Arizona.

She was elected a Fellow of the American Academy of Arts and Sciences in 1992 and a member of the American Philosophical Society in 2013. She is also a member of the Norwegian Academy of Science and Letters.

== Philosophical work ==
Julia Annas has advocated ethics based on character, building on ideas attributed to Greek philosopher Aristotle and making them relevant for contemporary moral discourse. She has argued that being virtuous involves "practical reasoning" which can be compared to the "exercising of a practical skill". Hence, she argues, rather than relating virtues to rules, principles, or an end goal, Annas says, first, people should ask how they can improve their moral "skills".

== Selected publications ==
=== Books ===
- Virtue and Law in Plato and Beyond (Oxford, 2017)
- Intelligent Virtue (Oxford, 2011)
- Plato: A Very Short Introduction (Oxford, 2003)
- Ancient Philosophy: A Very Short Introduction (Oxford, 2000)
- Voices of Ancient Philosophy: An Introductory Reader (Oxford, 2000)
- Platonic Ethics, Old and New (Cornell, 1999)
- Annas, Julia (1993). The Morality of Happiness. Oxford University Press. ISBN 978-0-19-509652-1. (reprint 1995, ISBN 978-0-19-509652-1)
- Hellenistic Philosophy of Mind (California, 1992)
- The Modes of Scepticism (Cambridge, 1985), with Jonathan Barnes
- An Introduction to Plato's Republic (Oxford, 1981)
- Aristotle's Metaphysics, Books M and N, translated with introduction and notes (Oxford, 1976)

=== Translations ===
- Plato, Statesman (Cambridge, 1995), with Robin Waterfield.
- Sextus Empiricus, Outlines of Scepticism (Cambridge, 1994), with Jonathan Barnes.
- Aristotle, Aristotle's Metaphysics Books M and N (Oxford, 1976).

=== Articles ===
- "What are Plato's "Middle" Dialogues in the Middle Of?" (Harvard University Press, 2002)
- "Democritus and Eudaimonism" (Presocratic Philosophy: Essays in Honour of Alex Mourelatos, edited by Victor Caston and Daniel Graham, Ashgate, Aldershot, 2002)
- "Aristotle and Kant on Morality and Practical Reasoning" (Aristotle, Kant & The Stoics, ed. S. Engstrom and J. Whiting, Cambridge 1996)
- "Virtue and Eudaimonism" (Virtue and Vice, ed. E. Paul, J. Jaul and F. Miller, Cambridge, 1998)
- "Prudence and Morality in Ancient and Modern Ethics" (Ethics, January 1995)
- "Epicurus on Agency" (Passions and Perceptions, Cambridge, 1993)
- "The Good Life and the Good Lives of Others" (The Good Life and the Human Good, Cambridge, 1992)
- "Plato the Sceptic" (Oxford Studies in Ancient Philosophy, Supp. Vol., 1992).
- "Plato's Myths of Judgement" (Phronesis Vol. 27 No. 2, 1982; pp. 119–143).

== See also ==
- American philosophy
- Sigmund H. Danziger, Jr. Memorial Lecture in the Humanities
