= Myles Burnyeat =

British scholar of ancient philosophy (1939–2019)

Myles Burnyeat CBE FBA
- Born: Myles Fredric Burnyeat; January 1, 1939; London, England
- Died: September 20, 2019 (aged 80)

Education
- Education: King's College, Cambridge, University College London
- Academic advisor: Bernard Williams

Philosophical work
- Era: Contemporary philosophy
- Sub-discipline: Ancient Greek philosophy, history of philosophy
- Region: Western philosophy
- Institutions: Robinson College, Cambridge, All Souls College, Oxford
- Notable students: Angie Hobbs
- Main interests: Epistemology, Platonism, ancient Greek philosophy

Myles Fredric Burnyeat (/ˈbɜːrnjeɪt/; 1 January 1939 – 20 September 2019) was an English scholar of ancient philosophy.

== Early life and education ==
Myles Burnyeat was born on 1 January 1939 to Peter James Anthony Burnyeat and Cynthia Cherry Warburg. He received his secondary school education at Bryanston School.

He completed his National Service (1957–1959) in the Royal Navy, during which time he qualified as a Russian interpreter. The training for this he completed at the Joint Services School for Linguists at Crail.

From 1959 to 1963, Burnyeat undertook undergraduate studies in Classics and Philosophy at King's College, Cambridge, where he earned a double first.

Subsequently, between 1963 and 1964, he was a graduate student at University College London. There he was a student under the supervision of Bernard Williams.

== Career ==
He became an assistant lecturer in philosophy at University College London in 1964, and a lecturer in 1965. In 1978, he was appointed a lecturer in classics at the University of Cambridge, and became a fellow of the new Robinson College, Cambridge, where he remained until 1996.

In 1984, he was elected a Fellow of the British Academy and appointed as the fifth Laurence Professor of Ancient Philosophy at Cambridge, a position he held until 1996. Burnyeat served as president of the Mind Association in 1987. In 1988 he became a member of the Institut International de Philosophie. In 1992 he was elected as an Honorary Foreign Member of the American Academy of Arts and Sciences. In 2000 he delivered the British Academy's Master-Mind Lecture.

From 1996 until 2006 he was Senior Research Fellow in Philosophy at All Souls College, Oxford. From 2006 he was an Emeritus Fellow at All Souls. From 2006, he would also hold the titles of Emeritus Professor of Ancient Philosophy and of Honorary Fellow at Robinson College.

He was president of the Aristotelian Society from 2005 to 2006.

In 2007, he was made CBE for his services to scholarship. That same year saw the publication of a Festschrift in his honour: Maieusis: Essays in Ancient Philosophy in Honour of Myles Burnyeat. The same included contributions from, amongst others, Mary Margaret McCabe and David N. Sedley.

In 2012 Burnyeat was awarded an Honorary Degree of Doctor of Letters by the University of St. Andrews.

His first marriage, from 1971 to 1982, was to lecturer in education and Jungian psychoanalyst Jane Elizabeth Buckley, with whom he had a son and daughter. From 1982 until 2000 he was married to the classicist and poet Ruth Padel, with whom he had a daughter Gwen in 1985. Both marriages ended in divorce.

From the winter of 2002 until her death in the spring of 2003 he was married to the scholar of ancient philosophy Heda Segvic, whose essays he prepared for posthumous publication. His partner in later life was the musicologist Margaret Bent.

Myles Burnyeat died on 20 September 2019 at the age of 80.

Concluding her 2012 laureation address, Professor Sarah Broadie noted of Burnyeat that:

"Above all, he is a paradigm to philosophers and classicists for combining formidable learning with first hand engagement in philosophy’s own concerns: principally its concerns with ethics and epistemology. His writings on the ancients take issue with such moderns as Russell, Moore, Wittgenstein, Descartes, Berkeley, and for that matter Ronald Dworkin. The aim – in which he has set and achieved the highest standards – isn’t simply to compare different specimens of the genus ‘philosopher’, but to open us up to the transformative toing and froing of philosophy as an on-going enterprise."

== Publications ==
=== Monographs (co-)authored ===
- Notes on Book Zeta of Aristotle's Metaphysics being the record by Myles Burnyeat and others of a seminar held in London, 1975–1979, Oxford: Sub-faculty of Philosophy, 1979, ISBN 9780905740171
- Notes on Books Eta and Theta of Aristotle's Metaphysics, being the record by Myles Burnyeat and others of a seminar held in London, 1979–1982, Oxford: Sub-faculty of Philosophy, 1984, ISBN 0-905740-27-0
- The Theaetetus of Plato Hackett 1990, ISBN 0-87220-159-7
- A Map of Metaphysics Zeta, Mathesis Publications, 2001, ISBN 0-935225-03-X
- Aristotle's Divine Intellect, Marquette University Press 2008, ISBN 0-87462-175-5
- The Pseudo-Platonic Seventh Letter (Uehiro Series in Practical Ethics), (co-author with Michael Frede) Oxford University Press 2015, ISBN 9780198733652

=== Essay collections ===
- Explorations in Ancient and Modern Philosophy, Vol. 1, Cambridge University Press 2012, ISBN 0-521-75072-5
- Explorations in Ancient and Modern Philosophy, Vol. 2, Cambridge University Press 2012, ISBN 0-521-75073-3
- Explorations in Ancient and Modern Philosophy: Vol. 3, Cambridge University Press 2022
- Explorations in Ancient and Modern Philosophy: Vol. 4, Cambridge University Press 2022

=== Works (co-)edited ===
- Philosophy As It Is (with Ted Honderich), 1979, ISBN 0-14-022136-0
- Doubt and Dogmatism: Studies in Hellenistic Epistemology (with Malcolm Schofield; Jonathan Barnes), 1980 ISBN 978-0198246015
- Science and Speculation: Studies in Hellenistic Theory and Practice (with J. Barnes; J. Brunschwig; M. Schofield) Cambridge University Press 1982, ISBN 0-521-02218-5
- The Sceptical Tradition (ed.) University of California Press 1983, ISBN 0-520-04795-8
- The Original Sceptics: A Controversy (with Michael Frede) 1997, ISBN 0-87220-347-6
- Bernard Williams, The Sense of the Past. Essays in the History of Philosophy, (ed. with introduction) Princeton University Press 2007, ISBN 9781400827107
- Heda Segvic, From Protagoras to Aristotle: Essays in Ancient Moral Philosophy (ed.), Princeton University Press 2008, ISBN 0-691-13123-6

=== Select articles/chapters ===
- "Socratic Midwifery, Platonic Inspiration," (1977) reprinted in Essays on the Philosophy of Socrates (1992)
- "Conflicting Appearances" 1979 Dawes Hicks Lecture on Philosophy for the British Academy.
- "The Inaugural Address: Wittgenstein and Augustine De Magistro" Proceedings of the Aristotelian Society, Supplementary Volumes, Vol. 61 (1987)
- "The Impiety of Socrates" Ancient Philosophy 17 (1):1-12 (1997)
- "Culture and Society in Plato’s Republic" 1997 Tanner Lecture
- "Plato on why mathematics is good for the soul" Lecture for the 1998 Dawes Hicks Symposia on Philosophy for the British Academy
- "Plato" 2000 Master-Mind Lecture for the British Academy
- "DE ANIMA II 5" Phronesis, Vol. 47, No. 1 (2002)
- "Platonism in the Bible: Numenius of Apamea on Exodus and Eternity" In: Salles, Ricardo (ed.) Metaphysics, Soul, and Ethics in Ancient Thought: Themes from the work of Richard Sorabji (2005)
- "Kinesis vs. Energeia: A much-read passage in (but not of) Aristotle's Metaphysics", Oxford Studies in Ancient Philosophy 34 (2008)
- "‘All the World’s a Stage-Painting’: Scenery, Optics, and Greek Epistemology" In: Oxford Studies in Ancient Philosophy 52 (2017)

Academic offices
Preceded by G. E. L. Owen	Laurence Professor of Ancient Philosophy; 1984–1996	Succeeded by Gisela Striker
Professional and academic associations
Preceded by Timothy Williamson	President of the Aristotelian Society; 2005–2006	Succeeded by Thomas Baldwin
