= Gábor Betegh =

Hungarian philosopher, academic (born 1968)

Gábor Betegh (born June 20, 1968) is a Hungarian academic, specialising in ancient philosophy. He is the eighth Laurence Professor of Ancient Philosophy at Cambridge University, having succeeded David Sedley in October 2014. He is Fellow of Christ's College, Cambridge, where he is Director of Studies in Philosophy and Graduate Tutor.

Betegh studied at Eötvös Loránd University, at Cambridge University (under Sedley), and at the École des hautes études en sciences sociales in Paris, under Jacques Brunschwig. His PhD dissertation was on the Derveni Papyrus.

In 2004 Betegh published The Derveni Papyrus for Cambridge University Press, an edition and study of the papyrus, which won a Choice Outstanding Academic Title Award.

Betegh was a professor at the Central European University in Budapest from 2001 to 2014 where he retains a visiting professorship. He was a Fellow at Harvard's Center for Hellenic Studies, the Wissenschaftskolleg zu Berlin, and the TOPOI project at Humboldt University. He has also been a visiting professor at Cornell University, the University of Florence, and the University of Rome La Sapienza.

Academic offices
Preceded by David Sedley	Laurence Professor of Ancient Philosophy Cambridge University; 2014 -	Succeeded by incumbent
