= G. E. L. Owen =

Welsh philosopher (1922–1982)

G. E. L. Owen FBA
- Portrait of Owen from a 1985 obituary
- Born: Gwilym Ellis Lane Owen; 18 May 1922; Portsmouth, Hampshire, England
- Died: 10 July 1982 (aged 60); Cambridge, Cambridgeshire, England
- Spouse: Sally Clothier

Academic background
- Education: Corpus Christi College, Oxford
- Academic advisor: Gilbert Ryle
- Influences: J. L. Austin

Academic work
- Discipline: Philosophy
- Sub-discipline: Ancient philosophy
- School or tradition: Analytic philosophy
- Institutions: Corpus Christi College, Oxford; Harvard University; King's College, Cambridge
- Doctoral students: John M. Cooper; Gail Fine; Mary Louise Gill; Wilbur Knorr; Martha Nussbaum
- Notable students: Julia Annas; Michael Frede; Terence Irwin; Richard Sorabji
- Influenced: David Bostock; Myles Burnyeat; Gareth Matthews; John McDowell; Malcolm Schofield; David Wiggins; Bernard Williams

Gwilym Ellis Lane Owen (18 May 1922 – 10 July 1982) was a Welsh classicist and philosopher who is best known as a scholar of ancient philosophy. He was a specialist in the work of the Greek philosopher Aristotle.

Born to a Welsh father and an English mother in Portsmouth, Owen studied classics at Corpus Christi College, Oxford, but was called up to serve as an intelligence officer in World War II. After returning to England, he taught philosophy at the University of Oxford and moved to a chair at Harvard University in 1966. His final appointment was the Laurence Professorship of Ancient Philosophy at the University of Cambridge, which he held from 1973 until his death in 1982.

One of the leading philosophers of his generation, Owen published numerous papers on Aristotle's metaphysics and ontology. Among his best-known publications are 'Logic and Metaphysics in Some Early Works of Aristotle' (1960), 'Dialectic and Eristic in the Treatment of the Forms' (1968), and 'Aristotelian Pleasures' (1972). Although most of his work focussed on Aristotle, he also wrote an influential article on Plato's Timaeus (1953). The central theme of his scholarly work was to demonstrate the importance of method and argument over dogmatism in ancient philosophy.

According to philosopher John M. Cooper, Owen "led [a] reorientation in ancient philosophy that began in the 1950s in Britain and North America". His papers, in the words of philosopher Malcolm Schofield, provided "a new way of writing about ancient philosophy", while his services to the discipline were recognised with numerous honours, including a Fellowship of the British Academy.

== Early life, education, and military service ==
Gwilym Ellis Lane Owen was born in May 1922 at Portsmouth in South East England, the son of the Welshman Ellis Owen and his English wife Edith Lane. His father worked as a secretary at the Portsmouth and Isle of Wight Ice and Cold Storage Company. After receiving his secondary education at Portsmouth Grammar School, he went to Corpus Christi College, Oxford, where he began to study classics in 1940. However, the following year he was called up for military service at the Royal Corps of Signals. Having served as an intelligence officer in Siam, Burma, and India until 1946, he returned to Oxford to continue his studies.

During his second stint at university, Owen became involved in the publication of The Isis Magazine, one of Oxford's student newspapers, and kept company with a group of contemporaries with literary interests. His friends included the novelist Kingsley Amis, journalist Ludovic Kennedy and the theatre critic Kenneth Tynan. In 1948, he graduated with a first-class Bachelor of Arts. Encouraged by the philosopher Gilbert Ryle, he went on to obtain a Bachelor of Philosophy. This degree, which he completed in 1950, marked a shift in academic interest from historical topics towards philosophy.

== Career ==
=== Beginnings in England ===
Owen's first academic appointment was a research fellowship at Durham University from 1950 to 1953. This brief stint saw the preparation of his first scholarly publication, an article on Plato's Timaeus. In 1953, he was elected to the newly established lectureship of ancient philosophy at Oxford. Although his post was designed to provide teaching on Pre-Socratic philosophy, he also directed regular classes on Plato and Aristotle aimed at graduate students. Together with Ryle and their colleague J. L. Austin, he provided a generation of future scholars with a foundation on these two philosophers. In addition to his university assignment, he became a fellow of Corpus Christi College in 1958. In 1963, he was elevated to a professorship.

During his time at Oxford, Owen was part of a drive to revive academic collaboration on the philosophy of Aristotle. He was one of the founders of the revived Oxford Aristotelian Society, an influential close-reading group. Their meetings were attended by a core of leading contemporary philosophers, including W. D. Ross, Martha Kneale and her husband William Kneale. His other collaborative project was the Symposia Aristotelica, triennial meetings of international Aristotle scholars initiated by Owen and the Swedish classicist Ingemar Düring. He was particularly engaged in organising the 1957 and 1963 editions of the conference, the latter of which was held at Oxford.

=== Harvard ===
In 1966, Owen left Oxford to take up the Victor S. Thomas Professorship at Harvard University. In the years preceding his appointment, he had made visits to the United States and had received offers of chairs from numerous universities. The new post afforded him improved working conditions "with ample funds and support" from the departments of classics, philosophy and the history of science. His move to the United States coincided with a rise in the stature of ancient philosophy at American universities, which was at that time fostered by the work of the Plato scholar Gregory Vlastos at Princeton University. Continuing the developments of his time at Oxford, he initiated a monthly research seminar (the "New York Seminars"), where scholars from the Northeastern United States would come together to discuss the work of Aristotle. He also enabled a number of distinguished European thinkers to make extended research visits to Harvard as Loeb fellows.

=== Cambridge ===
When the Laurence Professorship of Ancient Philosophy at University of Cambridge was vacated by the retirement of W. K. C. Guthrie in 1973, Owen made a successful bid to succeed him and returned to England. He was, in turn, elected a fellow of King's College, Cambridge, where he was given rooms in the pediment of the Gibbs Building. As in his previous posts, his focus lay on graduate teaching and seminars but he did not involve himself in faculty or university business while at Cambridge. He did, however, re-create his American research seminar by founding a parallel "London Group" dedicated to the study of Aristotle's Metaphysics. Since its inception in the 1970s, the group has produced volumes on several books of the Metaphysics.

Towards the end of his life, Owen suffered from episodes of depression, showed signs of burnout, and was prone to alcoholism. He died of a heart attack on 10 July 1982, aged 60. He was buried at the churchyard of Lower Heyford in Oxfordshire and was survived by his wife Sally.

== Personal life ==
During his time as a student journalist at Oxford, Owens met Sally Clothier, a student of St Hilda's College whom he married in 1947. They had two sons. From 1969, his wife and children lived in Oxford, while Owen spent most of the year at Harvard, returning to England only in the summers.

== Works ==
His first publication, a paper on the Timaeus (1953), traced how the dialogue improves the logical and argumentative underpinnings of the theory of forms introduced in the middle dialogues. He thereby challenged the then-orthodox view that placed the dialogue among Plato's late work. Although his views on this topic have not found universal assent, they introduced, in the words of philosopher Malcolm Schofield, "revolutionary" new perspectives to the study of the Platonic corpus. After editing two articles on Zeno of Elea and Parmenides respectively, Owen made his first important contribution to the study of Aristotle: his 'Logic and Metaphysics in Some Early Works of Aristotle' (1960) traced the use of the term "focal meaning" in Aristotle's ontology. His later time at Oxford saw publications on Aristotle's Phaenomena and, again, his ontology.

Among the work of his period at Harvard is a paper on the Topics ('Dialectic and Eristic in the Treatment of the Forms', 1968) in which he argued that Aristotle did not employ his dialectic method in an eristic fashion and that he instead engaged constructively with Plato's theory of forms. Owen's article 'Notes on Ryle's Plato', a guide to the second half of the Parmenides, provided, in the words of philosopher J. L. Ackrill, an "extraordinary condensation of material and analysis". In 1972, a paper entitled 'Aristotelian Pleasures' developed a reconciliation of two concepts of pleasures described in the Nicomachean Ethics.

In his years at Cambridge, Owen reduced his publishing activity. The two papers to emerge from this period were 'Aristotle on Time' (1976), an analysis of the reality of time presented in the Physics, and 'Particular and General' (1978) on the argumentative strategies of Book 5 of the Metaphysics.

== Legacy ==
Writing for the Routledge Encyclopedia of Philosophy, philosopher John M. Cooper stated that Owen "led [a] reorientation in ancient philosophy that began in the 1950s in Britain and North America". His central achievement, according to fellow philosopher J. D. G. Evans, was to demonstrate the importance of method and argument in classical philosophy, as opposed to mere dogmatism. For Evans, Owen's approach is illustrated by the "seminal article" 'The Platonism of Aristotle' (1967). His papers, according to Schofield, provided "a new way of writing about ancient philosophy".

Although his focus lay on Aristotle, Owen also made contributions to the study of Plato. His Bachelor of Philosophy thesis, a "bold and far-reaching study of logic and metaphysics" in Plato, laid the foundation for future work on a group of texts which, under Owen's influence, came to be called 'later dialogues'. Cooper writes that Owen "fundamentally altered, and deepened, the study of [Plato's late work]" but failed to garner universal support for his preferred, earlier dating of the Timaeus

Owen was particularly noted as a mentor for graduate students during his time at Oxford and Harvard, leading Ackrill to call him an "unrivalled teacher of graduates". In 1982, months before his death, a group of scholars presented Owen with a Festschrift of papers on topics in ancient philosophy. The volume, entitled Language and Logos: Studies in Ancient Greek Philosophy Presented to G. E. L. Owen, paid homage to Owen's influence as a teacher and dialectician. In 1986, a collection of new and previously published papers was released posthumously under the title Logic, Science and Dialectic.

== Honours ==
Owen was elected a Fellow of the British Academy, a fellow of the American Academy of Arts and Sciences and a foreign member of the Finnish Academy of Science and Letters. He served as the president of the Aristotelian Society in the year of its centenary (1978–79) and was invited to be the 1979 Sather Professor of Classical Literature at the University of California, Berkeley. Durham University awarded him an honorary doctorate.

== Bibliography ==
- Ackrill, John Lloyd (1985). "Gwilym Ellis Lane Owen" (PDF). Proceedings of the British Academy. 70: 481–99. Archived from the original (PDF) on 14 August 2021.
- Cooper, John M. (2002). "Owen, Gwilym Ellis Lane (1922–82)". Routledge Encyclopedia of Philosophy. ISBN 978-0415223645. (subscription required)
- Evans, J. D. G. (2005). "Owen, G. E. L.". In Honderich, Ted (ed.). The Oxford Companion to Philosophy (2 ed.). ISBN 978-0191727474. (subscription required)
- Montanari, Franco, ed. (2003). "G. E. L. Owen". Catalogus Philologorum Classicorum. Genoa.
- Nussbaum, Martha C. (2003). ""Don't Smile so Much": Philosophy and Women in the 1970s". In Alcoff, Linda Martín (ed.). Singing in the Fire: Stories of Women in Philosophy. Oxford: Rowman & Littlefield. pp. 92–204. ISBN 978-0742513822.
- Schofield, Malcolm (2004). "Owen, Gwilym Ellis Lane". In Cannadine, David (ed.). Oxford Dictionary of National Biography (online ed.). Oxford University Press. ISBN 978-0198614135. (Subscription, Wikipedia Library access or UK public library membership required.)
- Schofield, Malcolm; Nussbaum, Martha C (1982). "Introduction". In Schofield, Malcolm; Nussbaum, Martha C. (eds.). Language and Logos. Cambridge: Cambridge University Press. pp. ix–xiv. ISBN 978-0511550874.

Academic offices
Preceded by William Keith Chambers Guthrie	Laurence Professor of Ancient Philosophy Cambridge University; 1973–1982	Succeeded by Myles Burnyeat
Preceded by D. W. Hamlyn	President of the Aristotelian Society; 1978–1979	Succeeded by A. R. White
