= Richard Sorabji =

British historian (born 1934)

Sir Richard Rustom Kharsedji Sorabji, CBE, FBA (born 8 November 1934) is a British historian of ancient Western philosophy, and Professor of Philosophy Emeritus at King's College London. He is the nephew of Cornelia Sorabji.

== Life ==
Richard Sorabji was born in Oxford on 8 November, the son of Richard 'Dick' Kaikushru Sorabji (1872–1950) and Mary Katherine (née Monkhouse). He was educated at the Dragon School and Charterhouse. After two years National Service, he attended Pembroke College, Oxford, from 1955 to 1959 on the Boulter and Radcliffe Scholarship. He took second-class degrees (see Oxford University Calendar, 1958 p. 312 and 1960, p. 323) in 'Greek and Latin Literature' in 1957 and in 'Literae Humaniores' in 1959. Sorabji subsequently spent some time teaching at his old prep school before completing a B.Phil. at Oxford under Gwil Owen and John Ackrill.

Sorabji's first academic post was at Cornell University in 1962, where he became associate professor in 1968, while working also as an editor of the Philosophical Review. In 1970, he returned to England and joined the faculty of King's College London, where he was appointed Professor of Ancient Philosophy in 1981. His main interest has been Aristotle on whom he published his first books - Aristotle on Memory in 1972 (an annotated translation with introductory essays) and (as co-editor) four volumes of Articles on Aristotle from 1975 to 1979. He went on to write three books on the ancient philosophy of physics: Necessity, Cause and Blame (1980), Time, Creation, and the Continuum (1983), and Matter, Space, and Motion (1988).

Sorabji was President of the Aristotelian Society from 1985 to 1986 and founded the international Ancient Commentators on Aristotle project in 1987. The aim of this project has been to publish the first translations into English of mostly Greek philosophical texts from the period 200–600 A.D, mainly commentaries on Aristotelian works. 100 volumes have been published up the end of 2012, many of them translating the commentaries on Aristotle into English for the first time. Sorabji has himself contributed introductions to some of the volumes, as well as a general introduction to the commentators reprinted in many of the volumes. He lists the translations on his official website.

Sorabji has written essays and a book on M. K. Gandhi. He compares Gandhi to Stoic philosophy so that both Gandhian philosophy of life and Stoicism are illuminated.

Sorabji became a fellow of the British Academy in 1989. He founded the King's College Centre for Philosophical Studies between 1989 and 1991, with the aim of promoting philosophy to the wider public. He was Director of the Institute of Classical Studies from 1991 to 1996 and British Academy Research Professor at Oxford from 1996 to 1999. He gave Gifford Lectures in 1996 and 1997, which were later published in 2000 as Emotion and Peace of Mind: From Stoic Agitation to Christian Temptation. He was made a foreign honorary member of the American Academy of Arts and Sciences in 1999. Sorabji retired from King's College in 2000 and subsequently held teaching positions as Professor of Rhetoric at Gresham College, London from 2000 to 2003, adjunct professor at the University of Texas at Austin from 2000, distinguished visiting scholar at New York University from 2000 to 2003, and visiting professor at City University of New York from 2004. In 2008, he became Cyprus Global Distinguished Professor at New York University. Sorabji is an Honorary Fellow of Wolfson College, Oxford, a Fellow of King's College and a Research Fellow of the Institute of Classical Studies.

Sorabji was appointed Commander of the Order of the British Empire (CBE) in 1999 for his services to ancient philosophy, and knighted in the 2014 Birthday Honours for services to philosophical scholarship.

== Publications ==
- Aristotle on Memory (1972)
- Articles on Aristotle, with J. Barnes and M. Schofield, Vol. 1: Science, Vol. 2: Ethics and Politics, Vol. 3: Metaphysics, Vol. 4: Psychology and Aesthetics (1975–79)
- Necessity, Cause and Blame (1980)
- Time, Creation and the Continuum (1983)
- Ed. Philoponus and the Rejection of Aristotelian Science (1987; enlarged ed. 2, 2008)
- Matter, Space and Motion (1988)
- Ed. Aristotle Transformed (1990)
- Animal Minds and Human Morals (1993)
- Ed. Aristotle and After (1997)
- Emotion and Peace of Mind: From Stoic Agitation to Christian Temptation (2000)
- Ed. with the late R.W. Sharples, The Philosophy of Commentators, 200–400 A.D. (2003–2005)
- The Self: Insights from Different Times and Places (2005).
- Ed. with D. Rodin, The Ethics of War (2006)
- Opening Doors: The Untold Story of Cornelia Sorabji (2010)
- The Stoics and Gandhi: Modern Experiments on Ancient Values (2012)
- Perception, Conscience and Will in Ancient Philosophy (Variorum Collected Studies Series: CS 1030) (2013)
- Moral Conscience through the Ages: Fifth Century BCE to the Present (2014)

Plus 73 articles and two poems.
