= John M. Cooper (philosopher) =

American philosopher (1939–2022)

- Born: John Madison Cooper; November 29, 1939; Memphis, Tennessee, U.S.
- Died: August 8, 2022 (aged 82); Princeton, New Jersey, U.S.
- Awards: Marshall Scholarship

Education
- Education: Harvard University; Corpus Christi College, Oxford
- Doctoral advisor: G. E. L. Owen
- Other advisor: Gilbert Ryle

Philosophical work
- Era: Contemporary philosophy
- Region: Western philosophy
- School: Analytic philosophy
- Institutions: University of Pittsburgh; Princeton University
- Notable students: Michael N. Forster
- Main interests: Ancient philosophy, ethics
- Notable ideas: Analytic philosophy

John Madison Cooper (November 29, 1939 – August 8, 2022) was an American philosopher who was the Emeritus Henry Putnam University Professor of Philosophy at Princeton University and an expert on ancient philosophy.

== Education and career ==
Cooper graduated from Harvard University with a B.A. in philosophy in 1961, from Corpus Christi College, Oxford with a B.Phil. in philosophy in 1963, and from Harvard with a Ph.D. in philosophy in 1966. He taught at Harvard until 1971, when he accepted a tenured position in philosophy at the University of Pittsburgh, where he taught until he moved to Princeton in 1981. He was elected a Fellow of the American Academy of Arts & Sciences in 2001.

In 2011, Cooper delivered the John Locke Lectures at Oxford University, and in 2012, he delivered the Tanner Lectures on Human Values at Stanford University.

== Philosophical work ==
He is the editor of the Hackett edition of the complete works of Plato, as well as author of Pursuits of Wisdom: Six Ways of Life in Ancient Philosophy from Socrates to Plotinus and a number of other books on ancient Greek philosophy.

== Selected books ==
- Reason and Human Good in Aristotle (Hackett, 1975)
- Reason and Emotion (1999)
- Knowledge, Nature, and the Good (2004)
- Pursuits of Wisdom: Six Ways of Life in Ancient Philosophy from Socrates to Plotinus (2012)
