= W. K. C. Guthrie =

British scholar and philosopher (1906–1981)

W. K. C. Guthrie FBA
- Born: William Keith Chambers Guthrie; 1 August 1906; London, England
- Died: 17 May 1981 (aged 74); Cambridge, England
- Education: Trinity College, Cambridge
- Occupation: Classical scholar
- Notable work: A History of Greek Philosophy (1962–1981)
- Title: Cambridge University Orator; Laurence Professor of Ancient Philosophy; Master of Downing College, Cambridge
- Spouse: Adele Marion Ogilvy (m. 1933)
- Military career
- Branch: British Army
- Service years: 1941–1945
- Rank: Major
- Unit: Intelligence Corps
- Conflicts: Second World War

William Keith Chambers Guthrie FBA (1 August 1906 – 17 May 1981) was a Scottish classical scholar, best known for his History of Greek Philosophy, published in six volumes between 1962 and his death. He served as Laurence Professor of Ancient Philosophy at the University of Cambridge from 1952 to 1973 and as master of Downing College, Cambridge from 1957 to 1972.

== Early life and education ==
Guthrie was born on 1 August 1906. Although of longstanding Scottish stock on both his father's and mother's side, Keith Guthrie was born and brought up in London where his father, Charles James Guthrie, pursued a career with the Westminster Bank.

After attending Dulwich College, Guthrie went up to Cambridge University in 1925, winning the Eric Evan Spicer scholarship to Trinity College. He excelled in his studies, being supervised by, amongst others, Francis Cornford and A. S. F. Gow, and was placed in the first class of both Parts of the Classical Tripos, with distinction in Part II and the award of the Craven Prize.

After graduating he embarked on a postgraduate career at Trinity. He met his future wife, Adele Marion Ogilvy, while supervising her undergraduate studies in 1929–1930. She was an Australian, from Melbourne, then studying at Newnham College, Cambridge. They married in 1933 and went on to have two children (one daughter and one son).

== Early career and World War II ==
In 1930, Guthrie left Trinity College to take up a Bye Fellowship at Peterhouse, going on to become a full fellow in 1932. Between 1936 and 1937, he served as a university proctor and in 1939 was appointed as the university orator, responsible for delivering speeches in Latin in honor of recipients of honorary doctorates. He held this position for eighteen years.

During the war, he exchanged scholarship for military service, serving in the Intelligence Corps between 1941 and 1945, based initially in London, then in St Albans and, from 1943, in Istanbul, achieving the temporary rank of major.

== Postwar career ==
Returning to Cambridge after the war, Guthrie was much in demand in his capacity as Orator, called upon to deliver Latin encomia in honour of such dignitaries as Winston Churchill, Clement Attlee, Jan Smuts, Nehru, Dwight D. Eisenhower, Viscount Slim and General Montgomery.

In 1946 he was promoted to reader before becoming the third Laurence Professor of Ancient Philosophy in 1952, the year in which he became a Fellow of the British Academy. In 1950 he edited an edition of his mentor Cornford's essays under the title The Unwritten Philosophy.

In 1957 he moved to his third Cambridge college when invited to become the master of Downing College, where he would remain for the rest of his life. As master he took a full part in the administrative, cultural and social life of the college, occasionally preaching in the college chapel and supporting the undergraduate music club and boat club. He oversaw a rewriting of the college statutes and introduced a maximum term for a master of fifteen years, by which he chose voluntarily to abide although it did not apply to him.

In 1956 he was approached by the Syndics of the Cambridge University Press to write a history of ancient philosophy. The first volumes, devoted to the pre-Socratics, of what would be his life's magnum opus were published to high acclaim in 1962 and 1964. The work continued while he served as master of Downing and became his life's full mission after he retired from that position in 1972. The venture remained unfinished at his death aged 74 in 1981 the year in which he published the sixth volume in the series, devoted to Aristotle.

As a philosopher, Guthrie followed in the tradition of Francis Macdonald Cornford in believing that ancient philosophers should be read and interpreted against their own historical background, rather than engaged with, as has been the practice of later generations of classical philosophers, in the context of the whole canon of philosophy both ancient and modern.

Guthrie died 17 May 1981.

== Works ==
- Orpheus and Greek Religion (London: Methuen, 1935, revised 1952)
- Aristotle De Caelo (trans., intro., and notes 1939)
- On the Heavens, translator (1939)
- The Greek Philosophers (from Thales to Aristotle, 1950)
- The Greeks and their Gods (1950)
- The Hub and the Spokes (1953)
- Protagoras and Meno (1956) dialogues of Plato, translator
- In the Beginning: Some Greek Views of the Origins of Life and the Early State of Man (1957)
- Socrates (1971)
- The Pre-Socratics: A Collection of Critical Essays (1974)
- A History of Greek Philosophy, Volume I: The Earlier Presocratics and the Pythagoreans (1962)
- A History of Greek Philosophy, Volume II: The Presocratic Tradition from Parmenides to Democritus (1965)
- A History of Greek Philosophy, Volume III: The Fifth-Century Enlightenment – Part 1: The Sophists; Part 2: Socrates (1971)
- A History of Greek Philosophy, Volume IV: Plato – the Man and his Dialogues: Earlier Period (1975)
- A History of Greek Philosophy, Volume V: The Later Plato and the Academy (1978)
- A History of Greek Philosophy, Volume VI: Aristotle: An Encounter (1981)

== Sources ==
- William Keith Chambers Guthrie, 1906–1981 by G. E. R. Lloyd, Proceedings of the British Academy 68, 561–577

Academic offices
Preceded by Terrot R. Glover	Cambridge University Orator; 1939–1957	Succeeded by Lancelot Patrick Wilkinson
Preceded by Reginald Hackforth	Laurence Professor of Ancient Philosophy; 1952–1973	Succeeded by G. E. L. Owen
Preceded by Sir Lionel Whitby	Master of Downing College, Cambridge; 1957–1972	Succeeded by Morien Morgan
