= A. A. Long =

British-born American classical scholar (born 1937)

A. A. Long FBA
- Born: Anthony Arthur Long; 17 August 1937 (age 89)

Academic background
- Education: University College London (BA, PhD)

Academic work
- Discipline: Classics
- Institutions: University of Otago; University of Nottingham; University College London; University of Liverpool; University of California, Berkeley
- Doctoral students: Sally Haslanger; David Sedley

Anthony Arthur Long (born 17 August 1937) is a British-American classical scholar who is the Chancellor's Professor Emeritus of Classics, Irving Stone Professor of Literature Emeritus, and Affiliated Professor of Philosophy and Rhetoric at the University of California, Berkeley.

== Education and National Service ==
Long was educated at Manchester Grammar School (1948–1955) and University College London (1957–1960) where he took a first class honours degree in classics and was subsequently awarded a PhD degree. Between 1955 and 1957 he served in the Royal Artillery, retiring with the rank of 2/Lieutenant.

== Career ==
Between 1961 and 1971, Long held lecturer positions in classics at the University of Otago, the University of Nottingham, and University College London, where he was promoted to the position of reader in 1971. In 1973, Long moved to the University of Liverpool to take up the post of Gladstone Professor of Greek, a position he held until assuming the position of professor of classics at University of California, Berkeley in 1983. He was a visiting member of the Princeton Institute for Advanced Study in 1970 and 1979. At Liverpool he served as Public Orator from 1981-83. He edited the Classical Quarterly from 1975–81, and served as a senior fellow of the Center for Hellenic Studies,Washington DC, from 1988-93. He retired at the end of June 2013 but continues to be active as a professor of the Graduate School, teaching courses in classics and philosophy, while pursuing his programme of lectures and conferences and visiting appointments and ongoing research.

While at University College, London he supervised the doctoral thesis of David Sedley, the seventh Laurence Professor of Ancient Philosophy at Cambridge University. Special positions he has held include Kardinal Mercier Professor of Philosophy at the University of Leuven (1991), Belle Van Zuylen Professor of Philosophy at the University of Utrecht (2004), and Distinguished Visiting Professor of Philosophy at the University of Hong Kong (2013). Long is best known for his innovative work on Hellenistic philosophy.

He was elected a fellow of the American Academy of Arts and Sciences in 1989, Corresponding Fellow of the British Academy in 1992, and a member of the American Philosophical Society in 2009. He was awarded an honorary doctor of philosophy degree by the University of Crete in 2015.

== Publications ==
Long's career and work are profiled in "Ancient Models of Mind. Studies in Human and Divine Rationality" edited by Andrea Nightingale and David Sedley for Cambridge University Press (Cambridge 2010). He is the author or editor of the following books:

- Language and Thought in Sophocles. A Study of Abstract Nouns and Poetic Technique (Athlone Press, London, 1968), awarded the Cromer Greek Prize of the British Academy
- Problems in Stoicism, (editor) (Athlone Press, London, 1971, repr. 1996)
- Hellenistic Philosophy. Stoics, Epicureans, Sceptics (Gerald Duckworth and Charles Scribner's Sons, London and New York, 1974; 2nd ed. Berkeley and Los Angeles, 1986) translated into Spanish (1977), Greek (1987), Italian (1991), Hungarian (1998), Korean (2001), Japanese (2003), Czech (2003), Chinese (2021)
- The Hellenistic Philosophers. vol. 1 The principal sources in translation with philosophical commentary with D.N. Sedley (Cambridge University Press, 1987) transl into German (2000), French (2001)
- The Hellenistic Philosophers Vol. 2 Greek and Latin texts with notes with D.N. Sedley (Cambridge University Press, 1987)
- Theophrastus of Eresus. On His Life and Work, (co-editor with P.M. Huby and W.W. Fortenbaugh), (New Brunswick and Oxford, 1985)
- The Question of Eclecticism. Studies in later Greek Philosophy, (co-editor with J. Dillon) (University of California Press, 1988)
- Ierocle, with G. Bastianini, in Corpus dei papiri filosofici greci e Latini, vol. 1 (Florence, 1992): pp. 268–441
- Images and Ideologies: Self-definition in the Hellenistic World, (co-editor with A. W. Bulloch, E.S. Gruen, A. Stewart) (University of California Press, 1993)
- Stoic Studies (Cambridge University Press, 1996; repr. Berkeley and Los Angeles, 2001)
- The Cambridge Companion to Early Greek Philosophy, (editor) (Cambridge University Press, 1999) translated into German (2001), Greek (2005), Portuguese (2008)
- Epictetus. A Stoic and Socratic Guide to Life (Clarendon Press, Oxford, 2002)
- From Epicurus to Epictetus: Studies in Hellenistic and Roman Philosophy (Oxford University Press, 2006)
- Greek Models of Mind and Self (Harvard University Press, 2015) translated into Chinese (2015), Italian (2016), Greek (2019)
- Seneca: Letters on Ethics with Margaret Graver (Chicago University Press, 2015) translated into Vietnamese (2022)
- How to be Free: An Ancient Guide to the Stoic Life. Epictetus Encheiridion and Selections from Discourses (Princeton University Press, 2018) translated into German (2019), Greek (2019), Spanish (2020), Japanese (2020), Korean (2020), Arabic (2020), Indonesian and Serbian (2022)
- Seneca: Fifty Letters of a Roman Stoic with Margaret Graver (Chicago University Press, 2021)
- Plotinus, Ennead II.4 On Matter (Parmenides Publishing, 2022)
- Selfhood & Rationality in Ancient Greek Philosophy: From Heraclitus to Plotinus (Oxford University Press, 2022)

Video lecture: Stoicisms Ancient and Modern on YouTube
