= David Sedley =

British philosopher and historian (born 1947)

David Sedley FBA
- Born: 30 May 1947 (age 79)
- Education: Trinity College, Oxford; University College London
- Scientific career
- Fields: Ancient philosophy
- Workplaces: Christ's College, Cambridge
- Doctoral advisor: A. A. Long

David Neil Sedley (born 30 May 1947) is a British philosopher and historian of philosophy. He was the seventh Laurence Professor of Ancient Philosophy at Cambridge University.

== Early life ==
Sedley was educated at Trinity College, Oxford where he was awarded a first class honours degree in Literae Humaniores in 1969. He was awarded a PhD in 1974 by University College London for a text, translation and commentary on Book XXVIII of Epicurus' On Nature.

He is the younger brother of Sir Stephen Sedley.

== Academic career ==
Since 1976 Sedley has been a fellow of Christ's College, Cambridge; from 1996 he was Professor of Ancient Philosophy at Cambridge University before in July 2000 being elevated to the Laurence Professorship of Ancient Philosophy. He retired from this position at the end of September 2014. He was succeeded in this post by his former student, Gábor Betegh.

He has held visiting appointments at Princeton University (September 1981 – March 1982), University of California, Berkeley (1984 and 2004), Yale University (1990), and Cornell University (2001).

== Honours ==
He was elected a Fellow of the British Academy in July 1994.

== Publications ==
=== Book ===
- The Hellenistic Philosophers (with A. A. Long), Cambridge 1987
- Lucretius and the Transformation of Greek Wisdom, Cambridge 1998
- The Cambridge Companion to Greek and Roman Philosophy, Cambridge 2003
- Plato's Cratylus, Cambridge 2003
- The Midwife of Platonism. Text and Subtext in Plato's Theaetetus, Oxford 2004
- Creationism and its Critics in Antiquity, Berkeley and Los Angeles 2007
- Pyrrhonists, Patricians, Platonizers. Hellenistic Philosophy in the Period 155–86 BC (edited with A. M. Ioppolo), Naples, 2007

=== Articles and Chapters ===
- ‘The structure of Epicurus’ On nature’ Cronache Ercolanesi 4 (1974), 89–92
- ‘Epicurus, On nature, Book XI: an argument against Eudoxan astronomy’ in Proceedings of the XIV International Congress of Papyrology (Oxford 1974), 269–275
- ‘Epicurus and his professional rivals’ in J. Bollack, A. Laks (ed.), Études sur l’épicurisme antique (Cahiers de Philologie I, 1976), 119–159
- ‘Epicurus and the mathematicians of Cyzicus’ Cronache Ercolanesi 6 (1976), 23–54
- ‘Diodorus Cronus and Hellenistic philosophy’ Proceedings of the Cambridge Philological Society 203 (1977), 74–120
- ‘The protagonists’ chap. 1 of M. Schofield et al. (ed.), Doubt and Dogmatism: Studies in Hellenistic Epistemology (Oxford, 1980), 1–19
- ‘The end of the Academy’ Phronesis 26 (1981), 67–75
- ‘Two conceptions of vacuum’ Phronesis 27 (1982), 175–193
- ‘On signs’ in J. Barnes et al. (ed.), Science and Speculation: Studies in Hellenistic Theory and Practice (Cambridge 1982), 239–272
- ‘The Stoic criterion of identity’ Phronesis 27 (1982), 255–275; French version, tr. J. Brunschwig, ‘Le Critère d’identité chez les Stoïciens’, Revue de métaphysique et de morale 4 (1989), 513–533
- ‘Epicurus’ refutation of determinism’ in ΣΥΖΗΤΗΣΙΣ_: studi sull’ epicureismo greco e romano offerti a Marcello Gigante_ (Naples 1983), 11–51
- ‘The motivation of Greek skepticism’ in M.F. Burnyeat (ed.), The Skeptical Tradition (Berkeley/Los Angeles 1983), 9–29
- ‘On the Stoic goods in Stobaeus, Eclogae 2’ in W.W. Fortenbaugh (ed.), On Stoic and Peripatetic ethics: the work of Arius Didymus (Rutgers University Studies in Classical Humanities, 1; New Brunswick 1983), 85–86
- ‘The character of Epicurus’ On nature' in Atti del XVII congresso internazionale di papirologia (Naples 1984), 381–387
- ‘The negated conjunction in Stoicism’ Elenchos 5 (1984), 311–316
- ‘The Stoic theory of universals’ in Southern Journal of Philosophy 23, suppl., ‘Spindel Conference 1984: Recovering the Stoics’, 87–92; Chinese translation in Tsinghua Studies in Western Philosophy 4.2 (2018), 86–92
- ‘Three notes on Theophrastus’ treatment of tastes and smells’ in W.W.Fortenbaugh (ed.), Theophrastus of Eresus, on his Life and Work (Rutgers University Studies in Classical Humanities, 2; New Brunswick 1985), 205–207
- ‘Philoponus’ conception of space’ in R. Sorabji (ed.), Philoponus and the Rejection of Aristotelian Science (London/Ithaca NY 1987), 140–153
- ‘Epicurean anti-reductionism’ in J. Barnes, M. Mignucci (ed.), Matter and Metaphysics (Naples 1988), 295–327; French version in Les Cahiers Philosophiques de Strasbourg 15 (2003), 321–359
- ‘Epicurus on the common sensibles’ in P.M. Huby, G.C. Neale (ed.), The Criterion of Truth: Studies in Honour of George Kerferd on his 70th birthday (Liverpool 1989), 123–136
- ‘Philosophical allegiance in the Greco-Roman world’ in M. Griffin, J. Barnes (ed.), Philosophia Togata (Oxford 1989), 97–119
- ‘Is the Lysis a dialogue of definition?’ Phronesis 34 (1989), 107–108
- ‘The proems of Empedocles and Lucretius’ Greek, Roman and Byzantine Studies 30 (1989), 269–296
- ‘Teleology and myth in the Phaedo’ Proceedings of the Boston Area Colloquium in Ancient Philosophy 5 (1990), 359–383
- ‘Is Aristotle’s teleology anthropocentric?’ Phronesis 36 (1991), 179–196
- ‘Empedocles’ theory of vision and Theophrastus De sensibus’ in W.W. Fortenbaugh, D. Gutas (eds.), Theophrastus: his Psychological, Doxographical and Scientific Writings, Rutgers University Studies in Classical Humanities, 5; New Brunswick 1992), 20–31
- ‘Sextus Empiricus and the atomist criteria of truth’ Elenchos 13 (1992), 19–56
- ‘Chrysippus on psychophysical causality’ in J. Brunschwig, M. Nussbaum (ed.), Passions & Perceptions (Cambridge 1993), 313–331
- ‘Commentary on Mansfeld’ (on J. Mansfeld, ‘The idea of will in Chrysippus, Posidonius and Galen’) Proceedings of the Boston Area Colloquium in Ancient Philosophy 7 (1993), 146–152
- ‘A Platonist reading of Theaetetus 145–147’ Aristotelian Society suppl. vol. 67 (1993), 125–149
- ‘La causalità psicologica nel Fedone’ in A. Alberti (ed.), Realtà e Ragione (Florence 1994), 107–122
- ‘The dramatis personae of Plato’s Phaedo’ in T.J. Smiley (ed.), Philosophical Dialogues: Plato, Hume and Wittgenstein (Oxford 1995), 1–26
- ‘Three Platonist interpretations of the Theaetetus’ in C. Gill, M.M. McCabe (ed.), Form and Argument in Late Plato (Oxford 1996), 79–103
- ‘Aristotle’s De interpretatione and ancient semantics’ in G. Manetti (ed.), Knowledge through Signs: Ancient Semiotic Theories and Practices (Brussels 1996), 87–108; revised version, ‘Aristote et la signification’, Philosophie Antique 4 (2004), 5–25
- ‘Plato’s Phaedo in the third century BC’ in M. Serena Funghi (ed.), ΟΔΟΙ ΔΙΖΗΣΙΟΣ_: Le vie della ricerca (Studi in onore di Francesco Adorno)_ (Florence 1996), 447–455
- ‘The inferential foundations of Epicurean ethics’ in G. Giannantoni, M. Gigante (ed.), Epicureismo Greco e Romano (Naples 1996), 313–39; repr. in S. Everson (ed.), Ethics (Cambridge 1998), 129–150
- ‘Alcinous’ epistemology’ in K.A. Algra, P.W. van der Horst, D.T. Runia (ed.), Polyhistor: Studies in the History and Historiography of Ancient Philosophy (Leiden 1996), 300–312
- ‘Plato’s auctoritas and the rebirth of the commentary tradition’ in J. Barnes, M. Griffin (ed.), Philosophia Togata II, Plato and Aristotle at Rome, (Oxford 1997), 110–129
- ‘A new reading in the anonymous Theaetetus commentary (PBerol. 9782 fragment D)’ in Papiri Filosofici: Miscellanea di studi I (Florence 1997), 139–144
- ‘“Becoming like god” in the Timaeus and Aristotle’ in T. Calvo, L. Brisson (ed.) Interpreting the Timaeus-Critias (Sankt Augustin 1997), 327–339; longer version, entitled ‘The ideal of godlikeness’, in G. Fine (ed.), Plato 2: Ethics, Politics, Religion, and the Soul (Oxford Readings in Philosophy; Oxford 1999), 309–328 Longer version:
- ‘The ethics of Brutus and Cassius’ Journal of Roman Studies 87 (1997), 41–53
- ‘How Lucretius composed the De rerum natura’ in K.A. Algra, M.H. Koenen, P.H. Schrijvers (eds.), Lucretius and his Intellectual Background (Amsterdam 1997), 1–19
- ‘Platonic causes’ Phronesis 43 (1998), 114–132
- ‘Theophrastus and Epicurean physics’ in J.M. van Ophuijsen, M. van Raalte (ed.), Theophrastus: Reappraising the Sources (Rutgers University Studies in Classical Humanities, 8; New Brunswick 1998), 331–354
- ‘The sequence of Argument in Lucretius I’ in C. Atherton (ed.), Form and Content in Didactic Poetry, Nottingham Classical Literature Studies 5 (Bari 1998), 37–55
- ‘Le scuole filosofiche e le città’ in S. Settis (ed.), I greci vol. II.3 (Turin 1998), 467–482
- ‘The etymologies in Plato’s Cratylus’ Journal of Hellenic Studies 118 (1998), 142–156
- ‘Aristotelian relativities’ in M. Canto Sperber and P. Pellegrin (ed.), Le Style de la pensée. Receuil d’hommages à Jacques Brunschwig (Paris, 2002), 324–352; already published in Italian under the title ‘Relatività aristoteliche’, in Dianoia 2 (1997), 11–25, and 3 (1998), 11–23
- ‘Pythagoras the grammar teacher and Didymon the adulterer’ in Hyperboreus 4/1 (1998), 122–138; shorter version, entitled ‘Pythagoras the grammar teacher (PbrLibr Add MS 37516, 1)’, in Papiri filosofici: Miscellanea di studi II (Florence 1998), 167–181
- ‘The Stoic-Platonist debate on kathêkonta’ in K. Ierodiakonou (ed.), ΘΕΜΑΤΑ ΣΤΩΙΚΗΣ ΦΙΛΟΣΟΦΙΑΣ (special issue of Deukalion, 1997; in Greek translation), and in K. Ierodiakonou (ed.), Topics in Stoic Philosophy (Oxford 1999), 128–152
- ‘Lucretius’ use and avoidance of Greek’ in J.N. Adams, R. Mayer (ed.), Aspects of the Language of Latin Poetry (Proceedings of the British Academy, Oxford 1999), 227–246
- ‘Aspasius on akrasia’ in A. Alberti, R.W. Sharples (ed.), Aspasius: the Earliest Extant Commentary on Aristotle’s Ethics (Berlin 1999), 162–175
- ‘Parmenides and Melissus’ in A.A. Long (ed.), The Cambridge Companion to Early Greek Philosophy (Cambridge 1999), 113–133
- ‘Hellenistic physics and metaphysics’ in The Cambridge History of Hellenistic Philosophy (Cambridge 1999), 353–411
- ‘Metaphysics Λ 10’ in M. Frede, D. Charles (ed.), Aristotle’s Metaphysics Book Lambda (Oxford 2000), 327–e50
- ‘Socratic irony in the Platonist commentators’ in J. Annas and C.J. Rowe (ed.), New Perspectives on Plato: Modern and Ancient (Cambridge, Mass., 2002), 37–57; earlier version, ‘L’ironie dans le dialogue platonicien selon les commentateurs anciens’, in F. Cossuta, M. Narcy (ed.), La forme-dialogue chez Platon (Grenoble, 2001), 5–19
- ‘Epistemologia e teorie della natura nell’età ellenistica’ in Storia della scienza I (Istituto dell’Enciclopedia Italiana, Rome 2001), 678–690
- ‘The origins of Stoic god’ in D. Frede, A. Laks (ed.), Traditions of Theology (Leiden 2002), 41–83
- ‘Diogenes of Oenoanda on Cyrenaic ethics’ in Proceedings of the Cambridge Philological Society 228 (2002), 159–174
- ‘The collapse of language? Theaetetus 179c–183c’ published on line in Plato 3 (2003)
- ‘The school: from Zeno to Arius Didymus’ in B. Inwood (ed.), The Cambridge Companion to the Stoics (Cambridge 2003), 7–34
- (with Jacques Brunschwig) ‘Hellenistic philosophy’ in D.N. Sedley (ed.), The Cambridge Companion to Greek and Roman Philosophy (Cambridge 2003), 151–183
- ‘Zeno’s definition of phantasia kataleptike’ in T. Scaltsas and A.S. Mason (eds.), The Philosophy of Zeno. Zeno of Citium and his Legacy (Larnaca 2002), 133–154; also published as ‘La définition de phantasia kataleptike par Zénon’ in G. Romeyer Dherbey, J.-B. Gourinat (eds.), Les Stoïciens (Paris 2005), 75–92
- ‘Lucretius and the new Empedocles’ published online in Leeds International Classical Studies 2 (2003)
- ‘A Socratic interpretation of Plato’s Theaetetus’ Proceedings of the Boston Area Colloquium in Ancient Philosophy 18 (2003), 277–313
- ‘Etymology as a techne in Plato’s Cratylus’ in C. Nifadopoulos (ed.), ETYMOLOGIA: Studies in Ancient Etymology (Münster, 2003), 21–32; also ‘La tecnicità del metodo etimologico nel Cratilo’, in M. Migliori (ed.), Il problema del metodo in Platone e Aristotele(forthcoming)
- ‘The nomothetes in Plato’s Cratylus’ Studia Philonica Annual 15 (2003), 5–16
- ‘Philodemus and the decentralisation of philosophy’ Cronache Ercolanesi 33 (2003), 31–41
- ‘On Generation and Corruption I 2’ in F.A.J. de Haas, J. Mansfeld (eds.), Aristotle, On Generation and Corruption Book 1. Symposium Aristotelicum (Oxford 2004), 65–89
- ‘Stoic metaphysics at Rome’ in R. Salles (ed.), Metaphysics, Soul and Ethics. Themes from the Work of Richard Sorabji (Oxford 2005), 117–142
- ‘Empedocles’ life cycles’ in A. Pierris (ed.), The Empedoclean Cosmos: Structure, Process and the Question of Cyclicity. Proceedings of the Symposium Philosophiae Antiquae Tertium Myconense. 6–13 July 2003 (Patras 2005), 331–371
- ‘Les origines des preuves stoïciennes de l’existence de dieu’ in Revue de métaphysique et de morale 4 (2005), 461–4387
- ‘Verità futura e causalità nel De fato di Cicerone’ in C. Natali and S. Maso (ed.) La catena delle cause. Determinismo e antideterminismo nel pensiero antico e in quello contemporaneo (Amsterdam 2005), 241–254
- ‘The speech of Agathon in Plato’s Symposium’ in B. Reis (ed.), The Virtuous Life in Greek Ethics (Cambridge 2006), 49–67
- ‘Plato’s tsunami’ varying versions in THEO DORON (private festschrift for T.L. Zinn, 2006), in Hyperboreus 11. 2 (2005) 205–214, and (as ‘Lo tsunami di Platone’) in proceedings of a conference in honour of Antonio Carlini
- ‘Form-particular resemblance in Plato’s Phaedo’ Proceedings of the Aristotelian Society 106 (3) (2006), 311–27
- ‘Plato on language’ in H. Benson (ed.), A Companion to Plato (2006), 214–227
- ‘Equal sticks and stones’ in D.J. Scott (ed.), Maieusis (Oxford 2007), 68–86
- ‘Philosophy, the Forms, and the art of ruling’ in G.R.F. Ferrari (ed.), The Cambridge Companion to Plato’s Republic (Cambridge 2007), 256–283; earlier version of one part in International Symposium: The Ideal and Reality of Ancient Greek Democracy, Department of History, Aoyama Gakuin University, Tokyo, 2004
- ‘Atomism’s Eleatic roots’ in P. Curd, D.W. Graham (ed.), The Oxford Handbook of Presocratic Philosophy (Oxford 2008), 305–332
- ‘Socrates’ place in the history of teleology’ Elenchos 29 (2008), 317–34; revised version, ‘Socrates, Darwin and Teleology’, in J. Rocca (ed.), Teleology in the Ancient World (Cambridge 2017), 25–42
- ‘Myth, punishment and politics in Plato’s Gorgias’ in C. Partenie (ed.), Plato’s myths (Cambridge 2009), 51–76
- ‘Presocratic themes: being, not-being and mind’
- in Robin Le Poidevin, Peter Simons, Andrew McGonigal, Ross Cameron (eds.) The Routledge Companion to Metaphysics (2009), 8–17
- ‘Les dieux et les hommes’ in J. Barnes, J.-B. Gourinat (ed.) Lire les stoiciens (2009), 79–97
- ‘Epicureanism in the Late Roman Republic’
- in J. Warren (ed.), The Cambridge Companion to Epicureanism (Cambridge 2009), 29–45
- ‘Plato’s Timaeus and Hesiod’s Theogony’ in J.H. Haubold, G.R. Boys-Stones (ed.), Plato and Hesiod (Oxford 2009), 246–258
- ‘Three kinds of Platonic immortality’
- in D. Frede and B. Reis (eds.), Body and Soul in Ancient Philosophy (Berlin 2009), 145–161
- ‘Philosophy in the Artemidorus papyrus’
- in C. Gallazzi, B. Kramer, S. Settis (eds.) Intorno al Papiro di Artemidoro I. Contesto Culturale, Lingua e Stile. Atti del Convegno di Pisa del 15 novembre 2008 (Milan 2009), 29–53
- ‘The Theaetetus as an ethical dialogue’ in A. Havlicek, F. Karfik and S. Spinka (eds.), Plato’s Theaetetus. Proceedings of Sixth Symposium Platonicum Pragense (2009), 2–13. Revised version, ‘Plato’s Theaetetus as an ethical dialogue’ in A. Nightingale and D. Sedley (eds.), Ancient Models of Mind. Studies in Human and Divine Rationality (Cambridge 2010), 64–74
- ‘The status of physics in Lucretius, Philodemus and Cicero’ in A. Antoni, D. Delattre (eds.), Miscellanea Papyrologica Herculanensia volumen I (Pisa 2010), 63–68
- ‘Teleology, Aristotelian and Platonic’ in J. Lennox, R. Bolton (eds.), Being, Nature and Life in Aristotle: Essays in Honor of Allan Gotthelf (Cambridge 2010), 5–29
- ‘Philosophy’ in A. Barchiesi, W. Scheidel (ed.), The Oxford Handbook of Roman Studies (Oxford 2010), 701–712
- ‘Epicurus' theological innatism’ in J. Fish and K. Sanders (eds.), Epicurus and the Epicurean Tradition (Cambridge 2011), 29–52
- ‘Matter in Hellenistic philosophy’ in D. Giovannozzi and M. Veneziani (eds.) Materia (Florence 2011), 53–66
- ‘PHibeh 184: Platonist logic in the third century BC?’ in M.S. Funghi (ed.) Studi e testi per il Corpus dei papiri filosofici (Florence 2011), 227–239
- ‘The theoretikos bios in Alcinous’
- in T. Bénatouïl and M. Bonazzi (eds.) Theoria, Praxis, and the Contemplative Life after Plato and Aristotle (Leiden 2012), 163–181
- ‘Marcus Aurelius on physics’
- in M. Van Ackeren (ed.) A Companion to Marcus Aurelius (Oxford 2012), 396–407
- ‘Antiochus as historian of Philosophy’ in D. Sedley (ed.) The Philosophy of Antiochus (Cambridge 2012), 80–103
- ‘Aristotle on place’ Proceedings of the Boston Area Colloquium in Ancient Philosophy XXVII (Leiden 2012), 183–201
- ‘Plato’s theory of change at Phaedo 70–71’ in Presocratics and Plato: A Festschrift in Honor of Charles H. Kahn (Las Vegas, forthcoming 2012), 181–197
- ‘Cicero and the Timaeus’ in M. Schofield (ed.) Aristotle, Plato and Pythagoreanism in the First Century BC (Cambridge 2013), 187–205
- ‘La classification du Théétète par Thrasylle’ in D. El Murr (ed.), La Mesure du savoir. Études sur le Théétète (Paris 2013), 295–307
- ‘The atheist underground’ in V. Harte and M. Lane (eds.) Politeia in Greek and Roman Philosophy (Cambridge 2013), 329–348
- ‘From the Presocratic to the Hellenistic Age’ in S. Bullivant and M. Ruse (eds.), The Oxford Handbook of Atheism (Oxford, 2013), 139–151
- ‘Plato and the One-over-Many principle’ in R. Chiaradonna and G. Galluzzo (ed.), Universals in Ancient Philosophy, (Pisa, 2013), 113–137
- ‘Socratic intellectualism in the Republic’s central digression’
- in G. Boys-Stones, D. El Murr, C. Gill (eds.) The Platonic Art of Philosophy. Studies in Honour of Christopher Rowe (Cambridge 2013), 70–89
- ‘The unity of virtue after the Protagoras’ in B. Collette and S. Delcomminette (eds.), Unité et origine des vertus dans la philosophie ancienne (2014), 65–90
- ‘Horace’s Socraticae chartae (A. P. 295–322)’ Materiali e Discussioni 72 (2014), 217–241
- ‘Diogenes Laertius on the ten Pyrrhonist modes’ in K.M. Vogt (ed.), Pyrrhonian Skepticism in Diogenes Laertius (Tübingen 2015), 171–185
- ‘Varieties of definition’ in D. Ebrey (ed.), Theory and Practice in Aristotle’s Natural Philosophy (Cambridge 2015), 187–198
- ‘An introduction to Plato’s theory of Forms’ in A. O’Hear (ed.), The History of Philosophy, Royal Institute of Philosophy supplement 78 (Cambridge 2016), 3–22
- ‘Empedoclean superorganisms’ Rhizomata 4.1 (2016), 111–125
- ‘Epicurean versus Cyrenaic happiness’ in R. Seaford, J. Wilkins, M. Wright (eds.) Selfhood and the Soul: Essays on Ancient Thought and Literature in Honour of Christopher Gill (Oxford 2017), 89–106
- ‘Divinization' in P. Destrée and G. Giannopoulou (eds.), Plato’s Symposium: A Critical Guide (Cambridge, 2017), 88–107
- ‘Zenonian strategies’ in Oxford Studies in Ancient Philosophy 53 (2017), 1–32
- ‘Becoming godlike’ in C. Bobonich (ed.), The Cambridge Companion to Ancient Ethics (Cambridge, 2017), 319–337
- ‘The creation of the world in ancient Greek thought’ in Eranos Yearbook 73, 2015–2016 (Einsiedeln, 2017), 435–484
- ‘The duality of touch’ in A. Purves (ed.) Touch and the Ancient Senses (London and New York, 2018), 64–74
- ‘L’allusion empédocléenne en Lucrèce II, 1081–1083’ in S. Franchet d’Espèrey and C. Lévy (eds.), Les Présocratiques à Rome (Paris, 2018), 145–159; English version, ‘An Empedoclean allusion at Lucretius 2.1081–3’, in P. Burian, J. Strauss Clay and G. Davis (eds.), Euphrosyne: Studies in Ancient Philosophy, History, and Literature (Berlin and Boston, forthcoming), 15–28
- ‘The Phaedo’s final proof of immortality’ in G. Cornelli, T.M. Robinson, F. Bravo (eds.), Plato’s Phaedo (Sankt Augustin, 2018), 212–222
- ‘Epicurean theories of knowledge from Hermarchus to Lucretius and Philodemus’ in F. Verde and M. Catapano (eds.), “Hellenistic Theories of Knowledge”, Lexicon Philosophicum [online journal] 6 (2018), 105–121
- ‘Stoics and their critics on diachronic identity’ in Rhizomata 6 (2018), 24–39
- ‘Epicurus on dialectic’ in T. Bénatouïl and K. Ierodiakonou (eds.), Dialectic after Plato and Aristotle (Cambridge, 2019), 82–113
- ‘Self-sufficiency as a divine attribute in Greek philosophy' in A. Hunt and H. Marlow (eds.), Ecology and Theology in the Ancient World: Cross-disciplinary Perspectives (London, 2019), 41–47
- ‘The Timaeus as vehicle for Platonic doctrine’ Oxford Studies in Ancient Philosophy 56 (2019), 45–71
- ‘The opening lemmas of the Derveni papyrus’ in C. Vassallo (ed.), Presocratics and Papyrological Tradition: A Philosophical Reappraisal of the Sources (Studia Praesocratica) (Berlin/Boston, 2019), 45–72. Revised version, ‘The opening lemmas’, in G.W. Most (ed.) Studies on the Derveni papyrus vol. 2 (Oxford, forthcoming).
- ‘Énigmes et paradoxes dans la philosophie grecque ancienne’ in B. Collette-Ducic, M.-A. Gavray, J.-M. Narbonne (eds.), L’Esprit critique dans l’antiquité: I, Critique et licence dans la Grèce antique (Paris, 2019), 217–236
- ‘Etymology in Plato’s Sophist’ Hyperboreus 25.2 (2019) 290–301
- ‘Plato’s theology’ in G. Fine (ed.), The Oxford Handbook of Plato (Oxford 2019), 305–332
- ‘Creationism’ in L. Taub (ed.), The Cambridge Companion to Ancient Science (Cambridge 2020), 121–140
- ‘Carneades’ theological arguments’ in C. Balla, E. Baziotopoulou, P. Kalligas and V. Karasmanis (eds.), Plato’s Academy: a History (Cambridge, 2020), 220–245
- ‘Lucretian pleasures’ in P. Hardie, V. Prosperi and D. Zucca (eds.), Lucretius Poet and Philosopher. Background and Fortunes of De rerum Natura (Berlin, 2020), 11–22
- ‘Plato’s self-references’ in B. Bossi and T.M.Robinson (eds.), Plato’s Theaetetus revisited (Berlin/Boston, 2020), 3–9
- ‘Why aren’t atoms coloured?’ in U. Zilioli (ed.), Atomism in Philosophy: a History from Antiquity to the Present (Cambridge, 2020), 61–74
- ‘Lucretius on imagination and mental projection’ in D. El Murr (ed.), Le De rerum natura de Lucrèce: perspectives philosophiques, AITIA 10 (2020) [online journal]
- ‘Socrates’ second voyage (Phaedo 99–101)’ in F. Leigh (ed.), BICS Supplement 141, Themes in Plato, Aristotle, and Hellenistic Philosophy: Keeling Lectures 2011–18 (2021), 47–62
- ‘Xenocrates’ invention of Platonism’ in M. Erler, J. Hessler and F. Petrucci (eds.), Authorities and Authoritative Texts in the Platonist Tradition (Cambridge 2021), 1–37
- ‘An iconography of Xenocrates’ Platonism’ in M. Erler, J. Hessler and F. Petrucci (eds.), Authorities and Authoritative Texts in the Platonist Tradition (Cambridge 2021), 38–63

== Notes ==
Academic offices
Preceded by Gisela Striker	Laurence Professor of Ancient Philosophy Cambridge University; 2000–2014	Succeeded by Gábor Betegh
