= Laurence Professor of Ancient Philosophy =

Chair at the University of Cambridge

The Laurence Professorship of Ancient Philosophy at Cambridge University was established in 1930 as one of the offices endowed by the bequest of Sir Perceval Maitland Laurence; it is the oldest chair of ancient philosophy in the world. One woman, Gisela Striker, has held the post, and seven men.

== Laurence Professors of Ancient Philosophy ==
- Francis Macdonald Cornford (1930–1939)
- Reginald Hackforth (1939–1952)
- William Keith Chambers Guthrie (1952–1973)
- Gwilym Ellis Lane Owen (1973–1982)
- Myles Frederic Burnyeat (1984–1996)
- Gisela Striker (1997–2000)
- David Neil Sedley (2000–2014)
- Gábor Betegh (2014–present)
