= Mary Louise Gill =

American philosopher

- Born: 1950 (age 75–76)

Education
- Education: Barnard College; Columbia University; University of Cambridge
- Doctoral advisor: G. E. L. Owen

Philosophical work
- Era: Contemporary philosophy
- Region: Western philosophy
- School: Aristotelianism
- Institutions: Brown University, University of Pittsburgh, University of Cambridge, Dartmouth College, Stanford University, UCLA, UC Davis, Harvard University, University of Paris
- Main interests: Ancient Greek philosophy

Mary Louise Gill (born 1950) is an American philosopher who is the David Benedict Professor of Classics and Philosophy at Brown University. Her work primarily focuses on Plato, Aristotle, and other (primarily Greek) ancient philosophers.

== Education and career ==
Gill received a bachelor's in religion in 1972 from Barnard College and a master's in religion from Columbia University in 1974. She received a second bachelor's from Cambridge University in classics and ancient philosophy in 1976, and a master's and doctorate in classics and ancient philosophy from Cambridge, both in 1981.

Gill was an instructor of classics at the University of Pittsburgh from 1979 to 1981 before accepting an appointment as Assistant Professor of Classics and Philosophy there from 1981 to 1988. She was promoted to associate professor in 1988, full professor in 1994, and chaired the department from 1994 to 1997. Gill moved from Pittsburgh to Brown University as a professor of philosophy and classics in 2001, and was appointed the David Benedict Professor of Classics and Philosophy in 2013. In addition to her permanent appointments, Gill has also held a variety of visiting positions, including at Dartmouth College, Stanford University, UCLA, UC Davis, Harvard University, and the University of Paris.

She has previously served as the Chair of the Faculty of Brown University, the Chair of Classics at the University of Pittsburgh, and on the editorial boards of numerous journals and books.

== Philosophical work ==
Gill's work primarily focuses on ancient Greek philosophy, especially Plato and Aristotle. She has authored two books and one extensive introduction - Aristotle on Substance: The Paradox of Unity (1991), the long introduction to Plato: Parmenides (1994,) and Philosophos: Plato's Missing Dialogue (2012.) Aristotle on Substance: The Paradox of Unity attempts to resolve the problem posed by the juxtaposition of Aristotle's requirement that primary substances have conceptual unity with the composite nature of living organisms.

In Philosophos: Plato's Missing Dialogue, Gill attempts to explain the absence of the Philosopher, a dialogue which Plato repeatedly mentions in Theaetetus, Sophist, and Statesman, but which no record exists of Plato actually having written. Previous suggestions for the absence of the Philosopher include a lack of time in Plato's later years, it forming one of Plato's unwritten doctrines, or it being unnecessary because the Sophist had included much of its intended content. Gill suggests a fourth alternative - that Plato intentionally avoided writing the Philosopher with the intent that someone who had read well Theaetetus, Sophist, and Statesman could use the pedagogical clues contained in those dialogues to reconstruct the missing Philosopher (while becoming philosophers themselves in the process.) Gill's explanation of the Philosopher has been criticized for relying excessively on the assumption that all of Plato's later philosophy was strongly Aristotelian, but her close analyses of many of the significant passages in the three dialogues her book covers has been lauded as well worthwhile.

== Publications ==
- Aristotle on substance : the paradox of unity, 1989
- Self-motion : from Aristotle to Newton, 1994
- A companion to ancient philosophy, 2005
- Philosophos : Plato's missing dialogue, 2010
- Self-Motion, 2017
