= J. L. Ackrill =

English classical scholar

John Lloyd Ackrill, FBA (30 December 1921 – 30 November 2007) was an English philosopher and classicist who specialized in Ancient Greek philosophy, especially the philosophy of Plato and Aristotle. Ackrill has been said to be, along with Gregory Vlastos and G. E. L. Owen, "one of the most important figures responsible for the upsurge of interest in ancient Greek philosophy among Anglo-American philosophers of the second half of this century".

== Biography ==
Ackrill was born, to Frederick William Ackrill and Jessie Anne Ackril, in Reading, Berkshire where he attended Reading School.

In 1940 he entered St. John's College, Oxford as a scholar in Classics where his philosophy tutors were Paul Grice and John Mabbott. The next year he left for war service in the Royal Berkshire Regiment and General Staff, reaching the rank of captain. He returned to Oxford in 1945 to read Literae Humaniores (or 'Greats', a combination of philosophy and ancient history), graduating in 1948. He then accepted a teaching position as assistant lecturer in Logic at Glasgow before being appointed university lecturer at Oxford in Ancient Philosophy in 1949. Granted two years of study-leave, Ackrill was a visiting scholar at the Institute for Advanced Study in 1950-51 (as he was again in 1961-62) before becoming, in 1953, a tutorial fellow at Brasenose College. In 1966, Oxford university created a statutory chair in the History of Philosophy, to which Ackrill was elected as the first holder. He retained that Chair, whilst remaining a fellow of Brasenose, until he retired in 1989 as an emeritus professor. In 1981 he was elected a Fellow of the British Academy and, in 1996, an Honorary Fellow of St John's.

In 1953 he married Margaret Kerr with whom he had four children.

John Lloyd Ackrill died in Oxford on 30 November 2007.

In 2009, Brasenose College inaugurated The John Ackrill Memorial Lecture which is held annually "in honour of the outstanding contribution he made to the study of ancient philosophy".

== Major writings ==
=== Books ===
- Aristotle's Ethics (1973)
- Aristotle on Eudaimonia (1975)
- Aristotle the Philosopher (1981)
- Essays on Plato and Aristotle (1997)

=== Translations and commentaries ===
- Aristotle, Categories and De Interpretatione (1963)
- Aristotle, A New Aristotle Reader (1987)
