= Gisela Striker =

German classical scholar (born 1943)

- Born: 1943 (age 82–83)

Education
- Education: University of Göttingen
- Doctoral advisor: Günther Patzig

Philosophical work
- Region: Western philosophy
- Main interests: ancient philosophy

Gisela Striker (born 1943) is a German classical scholar. She is Professor Emerita of Philosophy and Classics at Harvard University and a specialist in ancient Greek and Roman philosophy.

== Education and career ==
Striker was born and educated in Germany, earning her doctorate in philosophy from the University of Göttingen under the supervision of Günther Patzig in 1969 and her Habilitation, also from Göttingen in 1978. She taught philosophy at Göttingen from 1971–1986, and then was professor of philosophy at Columbia University from 1986–1989, and then at Harvard from 1989–1997. In 1997, she became the sixth Laurence Professor of Ancient Philosophy at the University of Cambridge, England, serving until 2000, when she returned to Harvard. She expressed frustration with the ancient philosophy program at Harvard.

== Philosophical work ==
Striker specializes in ancient philosophy, teaching Plato and Aristotle, as well as earlier and later Greek and Roman authors. She has written mostly on topics in Hellenistic philosophy (the epistemology and ethics of Stoics, Epicureans, and Skeptics) and on Aristotelian logic. Her work on Aristotle's logic builds on the tradition started in 1951 by Jan Lukasiewicz and reinvigorated in the early 1970s by John Corcoran and Timothy Smiley.

Academic offices
| Preceded by Myles Burnyeat | Laurence Professor of Ancient Philosophy Cambridge University; 1997–2000 | Succeeded by David Sedley |
