= Jonathan Barnes =

British historian and philosopher (born 1942)

Jonathan Barnes, FBA (born 26 December 1942 in Wenlock, Shropshire) is an English scholar of Aristotelian and ancient philosophy.

== Education and career ==
Barnes, born on 26 December 1942, was educated at the City of London School and Balliol College, Oxford. He taught at Oxford University for 25 years before moving to the University of Geneva, where he served as Professor of Ancient Philosophy from 1994 to 2002. A Fellow of the British Academy since 1987, Barnes is recognized for his expertise in ancient Greek philosophy and has edited significant works on Aristotle and pre-Socratic thinkers. He received an honorary doctorate from Humboldt University in 2012 and took his éméritat in 2006 after teaching at the University of Paris-Sorbonne.

== Philosophical views ==
Barnes holds that our modern notion of the scientific method is "thoroughly Aristotelian." He emphasizes the point in order to refute empiricists Francis Bacon and John Locke, who thought they were breaking with the Aristotelian tradition. He claims that the "outrageous" charges against Aristotle were brought by men who did not read Aristotle's own works with sufficient attention and who criticized him for the faults of his successors.

== Personal life ==
He married in 1965 and has two daughters. He is the brother of the novelist Julian Barnes, and he and his family feature in the latter's memoir Nothing to be Frightened Of (2008).

== Writings ==
- The Complete Works of Aristotle, 2 vols, 1984; reprinted with corrections, 1995 (General Editor)
- Posterior Analytics (translation and commentary on Aristotle), (1975) (revised edition, 1994)
- The Ontological Argument (1972)
- Presocratic Philosophers 2 Vols., 1979; 1 vol. revised edition, 1982
- Aristotle (1982)
- The Modes of Scepticism (1985), with Julia Annas
- Early Greek Philosophy (1987)
- The Toils of Scepticism (1990)
- The Cambridge Companion to Aristotle (1995)
- Logic and the Imperial Stoa (1997)
- Barnes, Jonathan (2000). Aristotle: A Very Short Introduction. Oxford University Press. ISBN 978-0-19-285408-7.
- Barnes, Jonathan (2003). Porphyry Introduction (Clarendon Later Ancient Philosophers). Oxford University Press. ISBN 978-0-19-924614-4.
- Truth, etc. (2007)
- Coffee with Aristotle (2008)
- Methods and Metaphysics: Essays in Ancient Philosophy I (2011)
- Logical Matters: Essays in Ancient Philosophy II (2012)
- Proof, Knowledge, and Scepticism: Essays in Ancient Philosophy III (2014)
- Mantissa: Essays in Ancient Philosophy IV (2015)

== See also ==
- List of Old Citizens

== Sources ==
- Merritt Moseley, Understanding Julian Barnes, University of South Carolina Press (1997) [This book provides family info on the Barnes family.]
