= Cornford =

Cornford is an English surname. It may refer to:

- Adam Cornford, an American poet, librettist, and essayist
- Christopher Cornford, a British artist and writer.
- F. M. Cornford, an English classical scholar and poet
- Frances Cornford, an English poet
- Holly Cornford, ice hockey player
- James Cornford, English first-class cricketer
- John Cornford, an English poet and communist
- Tich Cornford, an English cricketer
