= List of Desert Island Discs episodes (2001–2010) =

Each BBC Radio 4 programme Desert Island Discs invites a castaway to choose eight pieces of music, a book (in addition to the Bible - or a religious text appropriate to that person's beliefs - and the Complete Works of Shakespeare) and a luxury item that they would take to an imaginary desert island, where they will be marooned indefinitely. The rules state that the chosen luxury item must not be anything animate or indeed anything that enables the castaway to escape from the island, for instance a radio set, sailing yacht or aeroplane. The choices of book and luxury can sometimes give insight into the guest's life, and the choices of guests between 2001 and 2010 are listed here.

Very rarely programmes will be repeated in place of new shows as a tribute to former guests who have recently died – for example Radio 4 repeated Humphrey Lyttelton's show, originally aired on 5 November 2006, on 15 June 2008. Desert Island Discs takes two short breaks, in spring and summer. BBC Radio 4 broadcasts new programmes for approximately 42 weeks each year on Sunday mornings, usually with a repeat transmission five days later. On Remembrance Sunday (in November) the programme is not broadcast but that week's programme gets a single airing in the Friday repeat slot.

== 2001 ==
Date	Castaway	Book	Luxury	More info
7 January 2001	Marquess of Bath	Combined dictionary and thesaurus	Laptop computer	more
14 January 2001	George MacDonald Fraser	Oxford English Dictionary	Typewriter	more
21 January 2001	Marguerite Patten	Pride and Prejudice by Jane Austen	Trowel for digging	more
28 January 2001	Terry O'Neill	Great Expectations by Charles Dickens	Wind-up radio	more
4 February 2001	Sir John Mortimer	Oxford Book of English Verse	Velázquez painting of old lady frying eggs	more
11 February 2001	Griff Rhys Jones	The Pickwick Papers by Charles Dickens	Newspaper	more
18 February 2001	Professor Sir Richard Doll	Oxford Textbook of Medicine by D. A. Warrell	A down pillow	more
25 February 2001	Charlie Watts	Collected Poems 1934-52 of Dylan Thomas	Drumsticks	more
4 March 2001	John Lill	Huge Tome on fauna and flora	Solar-powered piano	more
11 March 2001	Henry Sandon	A Shropshire Lad by A. E. Housman	Huge supply of Indian tea with Worcester tea pot	more
18 March 2001	Professor Peter Vanezis	-	-	more
25 March 2001	Shirley Hughes	Embarrassment of Riches by Simon Schama	A painting by Titian, Bacchus & Ariadne	more
1 April 2001	Sir Alec Broers	War and Peace by Leo Tolstoy	Lots and lots of chocolate	more
8 April 2001	Tanni Grey Thompson	A guide to edible foods on a desert island	Five juggling balls	more
15 April 2001	Ronald Blythe	Life of Johnson by James Boswell	Lots of paper with pens	more
22 April 2001	Chris Tarrant	The Silence of the Lambs by Thomas Harris	His lucky sixpence	more
29 April 2001	Tasmin Little	Harry Potter book by J. K. Rowling or Little Dorrit by Charles Dickens	Endless supply of coffee	more
6 May 2001	Margaret Drabble	The Old Wives' Tale by Arnold Bennett	Painting by Maurice Cockerill - Ariadne's Thread	more
13 May 2001	Sir John Sulston	Oxford Anthology of English Verse	The microscope used to examine the lineage of the roundworm	more
20 May 2001	Sir Timothy Clifford	A la recherche du temps perdu by Marcel Proust	Renaissance casket with a selection of 15th & 16th century Italian drawings in it	more
27 May 2001	Courtney Pine	Beneath the Underdog by Charles Mingus	1939 tenor edition saxophone	more
3 June 2001	Sir Thomas Allen	Under the Greenwood Tree by Thomas Hardy	Unlimited supply of paper, paints and pencils	more
10 June 2001	Sir Kyffin Williams	Germinal by Émile Zola	A small painting called "The Head of a Girl" by Michael Schwertz	more
17 June 2001	Frank McCourt	Oxford Anthology of English Verse	Pair of binoculars	more
24 June 2001	Sir Harry Kroto	Quantum Electro Dynamics Physics by Feynman	Airbrush computer graphics set	more
1 July 2001	Sir Stanley Kalms	The Wealth of Nations by Adam Smith	Pack of cards	more
8 July 2001	Peggy Seeger	A Scots Quair by Lewis Grassic Gibbon	Banjo with plastic head and an inexhaustible supply of strings and pegs	more
15 July 2001	Martin Bell	Corduroy (his father's first book) by Adrian Bell	Barrel of Adnam's Ale brewed in Suffolk	more
22 July 2001	Cormac Murphy O'Connor	Lifelines by Seamus Heaney	Grand piano	more
29 July 2001	Claudia Roden	A la recherche du temps perdu by Marcel Proust	Oil paints and brushes	more
5 August 2001	Lord Deedes	Original prayer book without any amendments	Mister Trumper's aftershave	more
12 August 2001	Joss Ackland	The Diary of Samuel Pepys	Huge jar of liquorice	more
19 August 2001	Bruce Fogle	A book on canoe craft	Molecular engineering laboratory - to construct a dog	more
26 August 2001	Lord Roll	Faust by Johann Wolfgang Goethe	Cassette recorder and cassettes	more
2 September 2001	Simon Schama	The Leopard by Giuseppe di Lampedusa	Bethsheba by Rembrandt	more
18 November 2001	Billy Connolly	Oxford English Dictionary	His banjo	more
25 November 2001	Ken Follett	Philosophical Investigations by Ludwig Wittgenstein	Entire cellar of a great collector of French wine	more
2 December 2001	William Hague	The Years of Lyndon Johnson by Robert Caro	Dojo	more
9 December 2001	Sir Cameron Mackintosh	Complete Cookery Course by Delia Smith	Solar-powered Magimix	more
16 December 2001	Anne Fine	Collected Poems of Philip Larkin	Pencil and paper	more
23 December 2001	Jamie Oliver	Doesn't read books - needs notepaper and pens to write recipes	Leatherman - like a Swiss Army Knife but more substantial	more
30 December 2001	Ewan McGregor	In Search of Lost Time by Marcel Proust	Chromatic harmonica	more

== 2002 ==
Date	Castaway	Book	Luxury	More info
6 January 2002	Sir Peter Morris	The Aubrey-Maturin series 20 (complete hardback set) by Patrick O'Brian	Golf clubs and balls	more
13 January 2002	Susana Walton	The Education of a Gardner by Russell Page	Downy Pillow	more
20 January 2002	Bob Worcester	Globes at Greenwich by Elly Dekker	Celestial and terrestrial globes	more
27 January 2002	Phyllis Sellick	The Oxford Companion to Music	Clockwork radio tuned to Radio 4	more
3 February 2002	David Linley	The Art of Looking Sideways by Alan Fletcher	Guitar	more
10 February 2002	Sir Paul Nurse	The Ascent of Man by Jacob Bronowski	Telescope	more
17 February 2002	Kazuo Ishiguro	Collected short stories of Anton Chekhov	Big roll of paper	more
24 February 2002	Sue MacGregor	History of the World by John Roberts	Unlimited supply of nicely-scented sun block	more
3 March 2002	Lord May of Oxford	Capablanca's Hundred Best Games of Chess by Hans Golombek	Isle of Lewis chess set from The British Museum	more
10 March 2002	Dame Beryl Grey	This Sceptred Isle by Christopher Lee	Box of watercolour paints	more
17 March 2002	Fay Godwin	The Rattle Bag by Ted Hughes and Seamus Heaney	Egg tempera paints, brushes, and boards to paint on	more
24 March 2002	Dorothy Rowe	The Oxford Companion to the Body edited by Colin Blakemore	A snorkeling suit with prescription goggles	more
31 March 2002	Gordon Ramsay	Kitchen Confidential: Adventures in the Culinary Underbelly by Anthony Bourdain	A fresh vanilla pod	more
7 April 2002	Fiona Reynolds	The Making of the English Landscape by W. G. Hoskins	The full collection of Ordnance Survey maps of the British Isles	more
14 April 2002	Sir Christopher Bland	The collected works of John Donne	Two and half miles of a Hampshire chalk stream	more
21 April 2002	Wayne Marshall	The Grove Dictionary of Music	A Steinway Model D piano, specially conditioned to deal with all weathers	more
28 April 2002	Betty Jackson	Vision: 50 Years of Creativity	Lipstick	more
5 May 2002	Jude Kelly	-	A notebook and pencil	more
12 May 2002	Sir Aaron Klug	A set of books on Roman Republican and Imperial Coinage	A set of mixed Greek and Imperial coinage	more
19 May 2002	Suggs	A concise book of Italian verbs	A nucleus of bees	more
26 May 2002	Sue Johnston	Dickens by Peter Ackroyd	BBC Radio 5 Live	more
9 June 2002	Leonard Rosoman	A Portrait of the Artist as a Young Man by James Joyce	A sloping lawn	more
16 June 2002	Jan Morris	The Mabinogi in modern Welsh	A hot water bottle	more
23 June 2002	Lady Longford	Diplomacy and Murder in Tehran: Alexander Griboyedov and the Tsar's Mission to the Shah of Persia by Laurence Kelly	An orange tree	more
30 June 2002	Minette Walters	The Oxford Dictionary of Quotations	Van Gogh's Irises	more
7 July 2002	Alan Titchmarsh	One of P. G. Wodehouse's Blandings novels	A box of watercolours	more
15 September 2002	Brian May	Out of the Silent Planet by C. S. Lewis	His own guitar: the Red Special	more
22 September 2002	Timothy Spall	The Pickwick Papers by Charles Dickens	A drum kit	more
29 September 2002	Dame Alicia Markova	Speaking of Diaghilev by John Drummond	The perfume Knowing by Estée Lauder	more
6 October 2002	Philip Pullman	A La Recherche Du Temps Perdu by Marcel Proust	A Jar of Apricots by Chardin	more
13 October 2002	Paul Gambaccini	The Complete Carl Barks Library by Carl Barks	Piano	more
20 October 2002	Carl Djerassi	The collected poetry and prose of Wallace Stevens	A solar powered computer with a secret compartment containing a white powder	more
27 October 2002	P. D. James	War and Peace by Leo Tolstoy	Pencils and paper	more
3 November 2002	Robin Cook MP	The National Hunt form book	A chess computer	more
15 November 2002	Marguerite Wolff	Alan Walker's biography of Liszt	A piano	more
17 November 2002	Christopher Ondaatje	Robert Service's Anthology of Poetry	A painting: The Blue Nude by Justin Deranyagala	more
24 November 2002	Iain Duncan Smith	The Alexandria Quartet by Lawrence Durrell	Oil paints	more
1 December 2002	John Malkovich	The Sound and the Fury by William Faulkner	A cappuccino maker	more
8 December 2002	Linton Kwesi Johnson	One Hundred Years of Solitude by Gabriel García Márquez	A bass guitar	more
15 December 2002	Sinéad Cusack	The plays of Anton Chekhov	A big hat with a lot of muslin	more
22 December 2002	Rowan Williams	A collection of W. H. Auden poems	A piano	more
29 December 2002	Patricia Cornwell	Essay on population by Thomas Malthus	An endless supply of notebooks and pens	more

== 2003 ==
Date	Castaway	Book	Luxury	More info
5 January 2003	George Foreman	An anthology of poems including the poem Waiting by John Burroughs	A pillow	more
12 January 2003	Gillian Anderson	The Power of Now by Eckhart Tolle	Recordings of her daughter and "her love" reading self-written stories and poetry	more
19 January 2003	Professor Baruch Blumberg	Ulysses by James Joyce	A flat water kayak suitable for rough water	more
26 January 2003	Sir Trevor Nunn	The Complete Works of Charles Dickens	A photo of his wife and all of his children	more
2 February 2003	Paul Whitehouse	A chord book full of songs and arias	A piano	more
9 February 2003	Sir Ian McKellen	A dictionary of flora and fauna	A grand piano	more
16 February 2003	Cornelia Parker	World of Wonder: 10,000 things every child should know	A solar powered vibrator	more
23 February 2003	George Clooney	War and Peace by Leo Tolstoy	An anchored yacht	more
2 March 2003	Gene Pitney	The Giant Book of Mensa Puzzles by Robert Allen	A case of Opus One wine	more
9 March 2003	Vic Reeves	Three Men in a Boat by Jerome K. Jerome	Potato seeds	more
16 March 2003	Nick Danziger	One Hundred Years of Solitude by Gabriel García Márquez	Pencils, paper and watercolours	more
23 March 2003	Claude-Michel Schönberg	All the Little Live things by Wallace Earle Stegner	A grand piano	more
30 March 2003	Kristin Scott Thomas	Sense and Sensibility by Jane Austen	A pair of mules by Christian Louboutin	more
6 April 2003	David Gilmour	The Qur'an	Acoustic guitar	more
13 April 2003	Margaret Atwood	The Arabian Nights: Tales from a Thousand and One Nights	A big huge vat of Culpepers Rose Geranium bath salts	more
20 April 2003	Rory Bremner	The Decline and Fall of the Roman Empire by Edward Gibbon	A radio	more
4 May 2003	Professor A. H. Halsey	Utopia by Thomas More	A solar powered radio	more
11 May 2003	George Fenton	Short stories by Chekhov	A piano or failing that for comfort a tin of condensed milk and an opener	more
18 May 2003	Franco Zeffirelli	Dante's Inferno	A hammock from Hermès	more
25 May 2003	Derek Brown	The Pickwick Papers by Charles Dickens	A steamer chair	more
1 June 2003	Meera Syal	A Hindi/English dictionary	A piano	more
8 June 2003	Vittorio Radice	La première gorgée de Bière et autres plaisirs minuscules by Philippe Delerm	Sunglasses	more
15 June 2003	Mark Tully	The major works by Gerard Manley Hopkins	A modern mini brewery	more
22 June 2003	Bishop John Sentamu	The Complete Chronicles of Narnia by C. S. Lewis	A kitchen	more
29 June 2003	Daniel Libeskind	The Prisons (Le Carceri: The Complete First and Second States) by Giovanni Battista Piranesi	Pencil and paper	more
6 July 2003	Barbara Taylor Bradford	David Copperfield by Charles Dickens	A bag of eye makeup, especially mascara	more
21 September 2003	Bryn Terfel	Angela's Ashes by Frank McCourt	The Wales Millennium Centre	more
28 September 2003	Nick Hornby	Barnaby Rudge by Charles Dickens	An iPod	more
5 October 2003	Nigella Lawson	The Divine Comedy by Dante Alighieri	Liquid Temazepam "to give me the possibility of a very pleasant exit"	more
12 October 2003	Herbert Kretzmer	The Great War and Modern Memory by Paul Fussell	A Zippo lighter	more
19 October 2003	Bill Cullen	Glimpses by Brendan Kennelly	An accordion	more
26 October 2003	Charles Kennedy	The Day of the Jackal by Frederick Forsyth	A CD player	more
2 November 2003	Christopher Frayling	Don Quixote by Miguel de Cervantes	The V&A Museum	more
16 November 2003	Jeremy Clarkson	A photograph album	A jet ski	more
23 November 2003	Sir Christopher Meyer	The Four Adventures of Richard Hannay by John Buchan and Robin W. Winks	A jukebox	more
30 November 2003	Henry Blofeld	A Pelican at Blandings by P. G. Wodehouse	A personal photo album	more
7 December 2003	Pat Barker	A book on tropical fish to identify them	Snorkelling equipment	more
14 December 2003	Nicholas Grimshaw	The complete works of Patrick O'Brien	RIBA drawings collection	more
21 December 2003	Emmylou Harris	A blank book	A library	more
28 December 2003	Paul O'Grady	The Borrowers by Mary Norton	Skin-So-Soft by Avon	more

== 2004 ==
Date	Castaway	Book	Luxury	More info
4 January 2004	Martha Lane Fox	War and Peace by Leo Tolstoy	A karaoke machine	more
11 January 2004	Jimmy Tarbuck	The Essential Henry Longhurst	His own set of golf clubs and balls	more
18 January 2004	Stephen Frears	The Decline and Fall of the Roman Empire by Edward Gibbon	A painting by his wife	more
25 January 2004	Paul Dacre	RHS A-Z Encyclopedia of Garden Plants by Christopher Brickell	A subscription to the Guardian newspaper for one year	more
1 February 2004	David Sainsbury	The Great Gatsby by F. Scott Fitzgerald	A large bath with a constant supply of hot water	more
8 February 2004	Sister Frances Dominica	The Earth from the Air by Yann Arthus-Bertrand	A chaise longue with a mosquito net attached	more
15 February 2004	Sacha Distel	The Alchemist: A Fable About Following Your Dream by Paulo Coelho	A grand piano	more
22 February 2004	John Cale	Repetition by Alain Robbe-Grillet	An espresso coffee machine with coffee beans	more
29 February 2004	Judith Kerr	A big, beautiful coffee table book of pictures	Pencils and thick paper to write and draw on	more
7 March 2004	Sir Gulam Noon	Long Walk to Freedom: The Autobiography of Nelson Mandela	Videos of cricket matches	more
14 March 2004	Bill Nighy	The First Forty-Nine Stories by Ernest Hemingway	A boxed set of blues harps	more
21 March 2004	Ralph Kohn	Mahler's copy of The Complete Works of Bach	A magic flute	more
28 March 2004	Jack Vettriano	SUMO by Helmut Newton	Triptych, May - June, 1973 by Francis Bacon	more
4 April 2004	Angela Gheorghiu	A book to learn good English	A cup of Jasmine tea	more
11 April 2004	Michael Morpurgo	The Rattle Bag: An Anthology of Poetry edited by Seamus Heaney & Ted Hughes	Waterslide	more
18 April 2004	Bernard Cornwell	A Glastonbury Romance by John Cowper Powys	His boat, but not to escape	more
25 April 2004	Antonio Pappano	Huckleberry Finn by Mark Twain	A piano	more
2 May 2004	Graham Norton	Mansfield Park by Jane Austen	A mirror	more
9 May 2004	U. A. Fanthorpe	A book to identify birdlife on the island	A bath with soap and towels	more
16 May 2004	Pen Hadow	The Oxford Book of English Verse	A six-inch nail	more
23 May 2004	Ken Adam	Propyläen Kunstgeschichte The History of Art	A sketchpad and felt pens to design	more
30 May 2004	Geraldine James	The Fatal Shore by Robert Hughes	An iPod	more
13 June 2004	Karan Bilimoria	The Alchemist: A Fable About Following Your Dream by Paulo Coelho	Yes Minister and Yes, Prime Minister videos	more
20 June 2004	Diana Athill	Vanity Fair by William Thackeray	Her own bed	more
27 June 2004	Tim Rice	Molesworth by Geoffrey Willans, Phillip Henscher and Ronald Searle	A telescope	more
4 July 2004	Michael Howard	The Years of Lyndon Johnson by Robert A. Caro	A hot shower and some soap	more
11 July 2004	Hugh Masekela	Nicholas Nickleby by Charles Dickens	A keyboard	more
19 September 2004	Joe Simpson	A blank book and pen	A drink-making machine	more
26 September 2004	Virginia McKenna	Animal: The Definitive Visual Guide to the World's Wildlife by Don E. Wilson	Language tapes to learn Italian and Swahili	more
3 October 2004	Desmond Morris	The Arabian Nights: Tales from a Thousand and One Nights translated by Richard Burton	A snorkel	more
10 October 2004	Anne Scott-James	The Semi-attached Couple by Emily Eden	A nightdress made of pure white cotton	more
17 October 2004	Sir Menzies Campbell	Treasure Island and Kidnapped by Robert Louis Stevenson	A set of golf clubs	more
24 October 2004	Jack Mapanje	Pride and Prejudice by Jane Austen	A guitar	more
31 October 2004	Matthew Pinsent	A world atlas	A shaving kit	more
7 November 2004	Ann Leslie	The completed works of P. G. Wodehouse	An enormous amount of garlic with garlic press	more
19 November 2004	Matthew Bourne	The Kenneth Williams Diaries	Spotted dick with Lyon's golden syrup	more
21 November 2004	Clive Stafford Smith	The Koran in Arabic and English	His computer	more
28 November 2004	Tracey Emin	Ethics by Spinoza, translated by G. H. R. Parkinson	A pen which would never run out	more
5 December 2004	Sir Bobby Robson	The First World War and The Second World War by John Keegan	A sunlounger with canopy to protect him from the sun	more
12 December 2004	John Fortune	The Leopard by Giuseppe di Lampedusa (in Italian and English)	A rug made by the Baluch people from Afghanistan	more
19 December 2004	Engelbert Humperdinck	Engelbert - What's In a Name: The Autobiography by Engelbert Humperdinck	A saxophone	more
26 December 2004	Kim Cattrall	An English dictionary	Fragrant body cream	more

== 2005 ==
Date	Castaway	Book	Luxury	More info
2 January 2005	Carlos Acosta	Dirty Havana Trilogy by Pedro Juan Gutierrez	A case of Havana rum	more
9 January 2005	Andy McNab	Any Dickens book	A gollock	more
16 January 2005	Sam Taylor-Wood	Birthday Letters by Ted Hughes	A karaoke machine	more
23 January 2005	Dr Jonathan Miller	The Invertebrates by Libbie Henrietta Hyman	A canvas roll containing a castaway's dissecting set	more
30 January 2005	Peter Maxwell Davies	A Sanskrit dictionary	Copper plate engravings of Dürer's Passion	more
6 February 2005	David Starkey	Microcosmographia Academica by Francis M. Cornford	Hot and cold running water, a bath tub and bath oil	more
27 February 2005	Geoffrey Palmer	The Oxford Book of English Verse by Arthur Quiller-Couch and The Oxford Book of Twentieth Century English Verse by Philip Larkin	A fly fishing rod	more
6 March 2005	Alison Richard	The Journals of Captain Cook	A solar powered shower	more
13 March 2005	Stephen Poliakoff	My Family and Other Animals by Gerald Durrell	A box of plastic straws to fiddle with	more
20 March 2005	Raymond Briggs	The complete works of Beachcomber	A full size billiard table with Radio 4 built into each leg	more
27 March 2005	Yvonne Brewster	A primer to learn Italian with a tape	Olive oil	more
3 April 2005	Lorin Maazel	Pensées by Blaise Pascal	Vermeer painting: The Piano Lesson	more
10 April 2005	Philippe Petit	The Ashley Book of Knots by Clifford Ashley	His mysterious object (an object found by his father that as yet no one can identify)	more
17 April 2005	Patrick Stewart	A compendium of the world's best science fiction so he can become an expert	His beloved billiard table and a shed to keep it in	more
24 April 2005	Jarvis Cocker	Sombrero Fallout by Richard Brautigan	A bed with a mosquito net	more
1 May 2005	Katharine Whitehorn	A Short History of Nearly Everything by Bill Bryson	A machine to distill whatever is there	more
8 May 2005	Josephine Cox	"A book which is in my head about my brother"	A photo album of her family	more
15 May 2005	Imelda Staunton	A book on astronomy	Modelling clay and tools	more
22 May 2005	David King	Wild Reckoning: An Anthology Provoked by Rachel Carson's "Silent Spring" edited by John Burnside and Maurice Riordan	A bunch of canvases with oils and brushes	more
29 May 2005	Satish Kumar	The collected writings of Mahatma Gandhi	A spade	more
5 June 2005	Nigel Slater	Derek Jarman's Garden by Derek Jarman	Howard Hodgkin's painting: Learning About Russian Music	more
12 June 2005	Betsy Blair	Reading Lyrics: More Than 1,000 of the Century's Finest Lyrics by Robert Gottlieb and Robert Kimball	An ice cream maker	more
19 June 2005	Alexander McCall Smith	A collection of W. H. Auden's works	A handmade pair of shoes	more
26 June 2005	Ruby Wax	The Magic Mountain by Thomas Mann	A huge bed	more
3 July 2005	Paulo Coelho	The complete works of Oscar Wilde	A trip around his island on Concorde	more
10 July 2005	Ronald Searle	The Oxford Dictionary of National Biography	The best Champagne possible	more
18 September 2005	Brenda Blethyn	A dictionary	A karaoke machine	more
25 September 2005	Julian Clary	Stop Thinking, Start Living by Richard Carlson	An all-purpose prosthetic arm	more
2 October 2005	Frank Gardner	A Passage to India by E. M. Forster	A solar powered buggy	more
9 October 2005	Michael Winner	The Catcher in the Rye by J. D. Salinger	A big supply of caviar	more
16 October 2005	Jacqueline Wilson	The collected stories of Katherine Mansfield	A fairground carousel	more
23 October 2005	Mario Testino	Demian by Hermann Hesse	His own pillow	more
30 October 2005	Boris Johnson MP	An Indian paper edition of Homer	A large pot of French mustard	more
6 November 2005	Chris Evans	A Christmas Carol by Charles Dickens	A pair of swimming goggles with prescription lenses	more
18 November 2005	Renée Fleming	The Lion, the Witch and the Wardrobe by C. S. Lewis	Coffee	more
20 November 2005	Mary Midgley	The Variety of Religious Experiences by William James	A solar hot water system	more
27 November 2005	Sir David Frost	The London A-Z	Sunday newspapers	more
4 December 2005	Colin Firth	Stories of Woody Allen	His guitar	more
11 December 2005	David Hope	The Pickwick Papers by Charles Dickens	A case of selected malt whiskies	more
18 December 2005	Maggi Hambling	The Complete works of Just William by Richmal Crompton	The wine cellar from All Souls College, Oxford	more
25 December 2005	John Rutter	Teach yourself mathematics illustrated by voluptuous women	A viola	more

== 2006 ==
Date	Castaway	Book	Luxury	More info
1 January 2006	Kelly Holmes	A set of encyclopaedias	A large supply of chocolate	more
8 January 2006	Richard Griffiths	Vanity Fair by William Thackeray	Velázquez's Las Meninas	more
15 January 2006	Frankie Dettori	The history of the Derby	A lifetime's supply of Pinot grigio	more
22 January 2006	John Sutherland	Vanity Fair by William Thackeray	An iPod	more
29 January 2006	Shirley Williams	Collected works of W. H. Auden	A personal computer linked to the Internet	more
5 February 2006	Jeremy Irons	The Ashley Book of Knots by Clifford Ashley	Rizla liquorice papers	more
12 February 2006	Karen Armstrong	The complete works of Milton	Continuous supply of very cold & dry white wine	more
19 February 2006	Frederic Raphael	The Oxford Latin Dictionary	A Montblanc pen, nibs and spiral-bound squared notebooks	more
26 February 2006	Rachel Whiteread	A reference book on the natural history of the island	Ink, pen, paper and correction fluid	more
5 March 2006	Jack Higgins	The complete works of Charles Dickens	A mobile phone	more
12 March 2006	Terence Stamp	The Wind in the Willows by Kenneth Grahame	One of his wheat-free loaves	more
7 May 2006	Daniel Barenboim	Ethics by Spinoza	A piano with a mattress	more
14 May 2006	Darcey Bussell	A biography of Audrey Hepburn	An eyelash curler	more
21 May 2006	Digby Jones	How Britain made the Modern World by Niall Ferguson	A video or pictorial book of '100 examples of excellence'	more
28 May 2006	David Cameron	The River Cottage Cookbook by Hugh Fearnley-Whittingstall	A crate of Scotch whisky	more
4 June 2006	Armando Iannucci	The complete short stories of H. G. Wells	A virtual sherry trifle	more
11 June 2006	George Davies	A book about learning to paint	A Cannondale bike	more
18 June 2006	Peter Mansfield	Family photograph albums	A helicopter	more
2 July 2006	John Browne	Other Men's Flowers: An Anthology of Poetry by Lord Wavell	A lifetime's supply of 'great cigars'	more
9 July 2006	Monty Don	Collected poems of Henry Vaughan	Rembrandt's Hendrickje Bathing	more
16 July 2006	Ian Rankin	A Dance to the Music of Time by Anthony Powell	A traditional American pinball machine	more
23 July 2006	Hanna Segal	In Search of Lost Time by Proust	A snorkel and polaroids	more
30 July 2006	David Edgar	An Evil Cradling by Brian Keenan	A piano	more
6 August 2006	Michael Rosen	The complete poems of Carl Sandburg	The didgeridoo belonging to his late son Eddie	more
13 August 2006	Simon Cowell	Hollywood Wives by Jackie Collins	A mirror	more
20 August 2006	A. A. Gill	Captain Slaughterboard Drops Anchor by Mervyn Peake	His children's pillows	more
27 August 2006	Joan Plowright	Remembrance of Things Past by Proust	A piano	more
1 October 2006	Quentin Blake	Collected works of Charles Dickens	Arches watercolour paper	more
8 October 2006	Jane Horrocks	Jamie's Dinners: The Essential Family Cookbook by Jamie Oliver	An endless supply of tissues	more
15 October 2006	Robert Fisk	Le Morte d'Arthur by Thomas Malory	A violin	more
22 October 2006	Camila Batmanghelidjh	Being and Nothingness by Jean-Paul Sartre	A yoyo	more
29 October 2006	Heston Blumenthal	On Food and Cooking: The Science and Lore of the Kitchen by Harold McGee	Japanese knives	more
5 November 2006	Humphrey Lyttelton	Collected works of James Thurber	A keyboard	more
17 November 2006	John Stevens	Reach for the Sky: The Story of Douglas Bader by Paul Brickhill	A cellar of Champagne	more
19 November 2006	Stephen King	Collected poetry of W. H. Auden	A water hammock	more
26 November 2006	Matt Lucas	The Deeper Meaning of Liff by Douglas Adams and John Lloyd	Oslo Court, his favourite London restaurant	more
3 December 2006	Raymond Gubbay	Collins Robert French/English, English/French Unabridged Dictionary	An espresso coffee machine	more
10 December 2006	Karl Jenkins	Michelin Guide to France	A piano	more
17 December 2006	Arnold Wesker	Remembrance of Things Past by Proust	Supplies of pen and paper	more
24 December 2006	Gloria Hunniford	War and Peace by Leo Tolstoy	Family photographs	more
31 December 2006	Anthony Horowitz	A large French dictionary	A fountain pen, ink and paper	more

== 2007 ==
Date	Castaway	Book	Luxury	More info
7 January 2007	Lady Natasha Spender	Desert Islands by Walter de la Mare	Her grand piano	more
14 January 2007	Edna O'Brien	Ulysses by James Joyce	a vault of a very good white wine	more
21 January 2007	Ann Daniels	The Worst Journey in the World by Apsley Cherry-Garrard	A bar of soap	more
28 January 2007	Brian Aldiss	John Halpern's biography of John Osborne	A banjo	more
4 February 2007	Neil Tennant	The Human Comedy by Honoré de Balzac	A DVD projector and DVDs	more
11 February 2007	Paul Abbott	The complete works of Arthur Miller	A writing pad and pencils	more
18 February 2007	Grayson Perry	An art book on Gothic and Renaissance altarpieces	Loads of really good pens and paper	more
25 February 2007	Andrew Neil	The Wealth of Nations by Adam Smith	A wind up radio	more
4 March 2007	J. P. Donleavy	The 1972 Social Register of New York	His own long-handled spoon to make dressings	more
11 March 2007	Andy Kershaw	Collected works of Ryszard Kapuściński	Lots of toilet roll	more
18 March 2007	Jo Brand	The History of the Decline and Fall of the Roman Empire by Edward Gibbon	A church organ	more
25 March 2007	Professor Raymond Tallis	Being and Time by Martin Heidegger	A video of a day in the life of his family	more
1 April 2007	Ben Helfgott	The History of Western Philosophy by Bertrand Russell	A bar with two discs for weight training	more
13 May 2007	Joanna Lumley	A huge atlas	Video camera and film	more
20 May 2007	Greg Dyke	Complete works of Dylan Thomas	A guitar with a guide to playing it	more
27 May 2007	Paul McKenna	The Path of the Human Being by Dennis Genpo Merzel	Collage of photos of family, friends and girlfriend	more
3 June 2007	Tom Blundell	Lessons in Ndebele by James Pelling and Pamela Pelling	A combined heat and power micro-unit	more
10 June 2007	Yoko Ono	Sai-Yu-Ki	Her life for the next thirty years	more
17 June 2007	Christy Moore	Collection of Popular Songs of England & Scotland by Francis Child	A set of Uilleann pipes	more
24 June 2007	Ricky Gervais	A coffee table book of art	Vat of Novocaine - a non-addictive pain-killer	more
1 July 2007	Wangari Maathai	The Koran	A huge basket of fruit	more
8 July 2007	Simon Russell Beale	Book on medieval history (Cambridge Press)	Daily Araucaria crossword	more
15 July 2007	Oliver Postgate	Huge book of English poetry	A comfortable bed	more
22 July 2007	Thomas Keneally	Collected plays of George Bernard Shaw	Can of caviar, spoon and tin opener	more
29 July 2007	Nicola Horlick	The Alchemist by Paulo Coelho	A bath	more
5 August 2007	Andrew Davies	Great Expectations by Charles Dickens	Endless supply of Mojitos	more
12 August 2007	Felix Dennis	Dictionary of National Biography	A very long stainless steel shaft to encourage pole dancing mermaids	more
19 August 2007	Vladimir Jurowski	The complete works of Alexander Pushkin	A piano	more
30 September 2007	George Michael	Any book of short stories by Doris Lessing	Aston Martin DB9	more
7 October 2007	Alan Johnson	The complete diaries by Samuel Pepys	A digital radio	more
14 October 2007	Jill Balcon	Collected works of Thomas Hardy	A barrel of Guerlain Jicky perfume	more
21 October 2007	Ronnie Corbett	Untold Stories by Alan Bennett	A hammock	more
28 October 2007	Lord Joffe	Long Walk to Freedom by Nelson Mandela	A wind up radio	more
4 November 2007	Nicholas Parsons	Oxford Anthology of English Poetry	Portable radio with an endless supply of batteries	more
16 November 2007	Jung Chang	First Love by Ivan Turgenev	Snorkelling gear	more
18 November 2007	Eliza Manningham-Buller	The Rattle Bag – Anthology of poetry edited by Ted Hughes and Seamus Heaney	Large supply of pencils and pens	more
25 November 2007	Armistead Maupin	The Cole Porter Songbook	Vaporiser	more
2 December 2007	Steven Isserlis	Collected works of Anthony Trollope	A huge, huge photo album of all my friends	more
9 December 2007	Alec Jeffreys	Complete books of Flashman by George McDonald Fraser	World's biggest Church organ	more
16 December 2007	Paul Weller	Absolute Beginners by Colin MacInnes	A settee to sit on	more
23 December 2007	Victoria Wood	A big Dickens book	A bumper book of Sudoku with blank pages and pen	more
30 December 2007	Karren Brady	Pride and Prejudice by Jane Austen	Her own pillow	more

== 2008 ==
Date	Castaway	Book	Luxury	More info
6 January 2008	John Humphrys	Biggest poetry anthology possible	A cello	more
13 January 2008	Simon Rattle	Don Quixote by Miguel de Cervantes	Italian coffee machine and grinder	more
20 January 2008	Rory Stewart	A parallel text of the Bhagvad Gita	A ceramic bowl from the village of Istalif in Afghanistan	more
3 February 2008	Beryl Bainbridge	Case books of John Hunter	Pens and paper	more
10 February 2008	Oleg Gordievsky	Encyclopædia Britannica	Good toiletries for my bath	more
17 February 2008	Martin Evans	Largest anthology of poetry possible	A microscope, equipment and a stack of notebooks	more
24 February 2008	David Dimbleby	The collected works of Michel de Montaigne's essays	A collection of drawing books, pencils and varnish	more
2 March 2008	Michael Ball	The Sandman series by Neil Gaiman	Cloudy Bay Sauvignon blanc	more
9 March 2008	Liz Smith	A very large catalogue	A complete artist's set	more
16 March 2008	Tariq Ali	Collected works of Marcel Proust	A mini DVD player	more
23 March 2008	Stanley McMurtry	Collected works of John Steinbeck	Tenor saxophone	more
30 March 2008	Penelope Wilton	An anthology of 20th century European poetry	An open-air cinema with a selection of films	more
11 May 2008	Annie Lennox	The Power of Now by Eckhart Tolle	Suncream	more
18 May 2008	Diane Abbott	Volumes of architectural & historical surveys of London	A nice bed with comfortable mattress, sheets and mosquito net	more
25 May 2008	Howard Goodall	The diary of Anne Frank	Ice cold vanilla vodka and tonics	more
1 June 2008	Lord Woolf	The Koran	A happy photograph of his whole family including the latest grandchildren	more
8 June 2008	Bill Bailey	Collected works of Somerset Maugham	Pack of cards	more
20 June 2008	Peter Carey	Austerlitz by W G Sebald	A ‘magic’ pudding and a drink	more
22 June 2008	Ara Darzi	Yes Minister	Pencil and paper	more
29 June 2008	Posy Simmonds	Four volumes of the London telephone directory	The Crown Jewels	more
6 July 2008	Antonio Carluccio	His Dark Materials by Philip Pullman	White truffles	more
13 July 2008	Felicity Lott	Les Misérables by Victor Hugo	Lots of champagne and pistachio nuts	more
20 July 2008	John Stefanidis	Odyssey by Homer	Sketch book with many pencils	more
27 July 2008	Antonia Fraser	The complete works of Walter Scott	Strings and strings of false pearls	more
3 August 2008	Richard Ingrams	Teach yourself piano tuning	Grand piano	more
10 August 2008	A. C. Grayling	The Man Without Qualities by Robert Musil	A good piano	more
17 August 2008	Ruthie Henshall	The Selfish Giant by Oscar Wilde	A jar of Hellmann's mayonnaise	more
28 September 2008	Miriam Margolyes	Little Dorrit by Charles Dickens	A flush toilet	more
5 October 2008	David McVicar	Vanity Fair by Thackeray	Well stocked bar and fridge	more
12 October 2008	Sanjeev Bhaskar	The Hitchhiker's Guide to the Galaxy by Douglas Adams	A grand piano	more
19 October 2008	Randy Newman	Divine Comedy by Dante in Italian with English translation	A piano	more
26 October 2008	Ian Bostridge	War and Peace by Leo Tolstoy	A solar computer loaded with pictures of my family and friends	more
2 November 2008	Shami Chakrabarti	To Kill a Mockingbird by Harper Lee	A private screening room with movies	more
14 November 2008	Allan Ahlberg	Selected Stories by Alice Munro	A wall to kick a football against	more
16 November 2008	David Davis MP	The complete works of Iain Banks	A magic wine cellar which never runs out	more
23 November 2008	Janet Street-Porter	Larousse Gastronomique	Notebook and pens	more
30 November 2008	Michael Eavis	Blake by Peter Ackroyd	A mouth organ with instruction book	more
7 December 2008	Marcus du Sautoy	The Glass Bead Game by Hermann Hesse	His own trumpet	more
14 December 2008	Michael Deeley	A decently translated book of The Qur'an	200 cases of vintage wine	more
21 December 2008	James Nesbitt	The collective writings of James Lawton	A bottle of chilled Sancerre for every night	more
28 December 2008	Haleh Afshar	The poems of the Iranian poet Hafiz	A rose bush	more

== 2009 ==
Date	Castaway	Book	Luxury	More info
4 January 2009	Simon Murray	Cautionary tales by Hilaire Belloc	Lots of paper, pencils, and pencil sharpener	more
11 January 2009	Ruth Padel	The Iliad by Homer	A lot of paper and pencils	more
18 January 2009	Vincent Cable MP	A Brief History of Time by Stephen Hawking	An Aston Martin car	more
25 January 2009	Alan Sillitoe	The Air Publication 1234 (RAF manual for navigation)	A communications receiver – receiving only	more
1 February 2009	Thomas Quasthoff	Long Walk to Freedom by Nelson Mandela	Good wine	more
8 February 2009	David Suchet	Magnum Magnum edited by Brigitte Lardinois	His clarinet and an unlimited supply of reeds	more
15 February 2009	Professor Dame Kay Davies	Untold Stories by Alan Bennett	A piano	more
22 February 2009	David Walliams	Collected poems (edition 1988 or 2003 not stated) of Philip Larkin	A gun (to shoot himself, if lonely)	more
1 March 2009	Lord Rix	Encyclopædia Britannica	A proper orthopaedic cushion	more
8 March 2009	Richard Madeley	Jonathan Strange & Mr Norrell by Susanna Clarke	Guitar	more
15 March 2009	Baaba Maal	Coups de Pilon by David Diop	Guitar	more
22 March 2009	Athene Donald	A set of the Lymond novels of Dorothy Dunnett	A bath	more
29 March 2009	Sebastian Faulks	C. K. Scott Moncrieff's translation of Proust's Remembrance of Things Past	A wicket, cricket bat, net, an endless supply of balls and a bowling machine that can be set to replicate the style of any bowler	more
10 May 2009	Whoopi Goldberg	Letters to a Young Poet by Rainer Maria Rilke	Wise Potato Chips	more
17 May 2009	Peter Sallis	The collected works of P. G. Wodehouse	No. 7 Meccano outfit	more
24 May 2009	Barry Humphries	The Melbourne Street Directory (an old version)	Paints	more
31 May 2009	Caroline, Countess of Cranbrook	Food in England by Dorothy Hartley	Ink and a pen	more
7 June 2009	Piers Morgan	An Evil Cradling by Brian Keenan	His cricket bat	more
14 June 2009	Baron Healey	Faber Book of English Verse	Very large box of chocolates including nougat	more
21 June 2009	Martin Shaw	Post Captain in the Aubrey–Maturin series by Patrick O'Brian	A synthesiser to make up his own music	more
28 June 2009	Arlene Phillips	Little Women by Louisa May Alcott	Tweezers	more
5 July 2009	Harvey Goldsmith	The Reader's Digest Do-It-Yourself Guide	A piano	more
12 July 2009	Hugh Pennington	The Cabinet Cyclopedia edited by Dionysius Lardner	A brass microscope	more
19 July 2009	David Mitchell	Decline and Fall by Evelyn Waugh	DVD player and sitcom boxsets	more
26 July 2009	Hugh Fearnley-Whittingstall	Moby Dick by Herman Melville	Full set of Scuba gear	more
2 August 2009	Nicky Haslam	Legacy by Sybille Bedford	A large 18th-century picture	more
9 August 2009	Dame Joan Bakewell	War and Peace by Leo Tolstoy	An abundance of paper and pencils	more
16 August 2009	Roberto Alagna	The works of Victor Hugo	A guitar	more
27 September 2009	Barry Manilow	Man vs Wild - Survival Techniques from the Most Dangerous Places on Earth by Bear Grylls	A piano	more
4 October 2009	Ellen MacArthur	The SAS Survival Handbook	A fluffy purple worm (which has been taken everywhere)	more
11 October 2009	Steve Coogan	The Life and Opinions of Tristram Shandy, Gentleman by Laurence Sterne	Fully restored Morris Minor Traveller with wooden detail	more
18 October 2009	Jan Pienkowski	An audiobook of Martin Jarvis reading Just William by Richmal Crompton	A large supply of Moleskine sketch books	more
25 October 2009	Colin Pillinger	Journey into Space by Charles Chilton	A picture of the Clifton Suspension Bridge	more
1 November 2009	Jerry Springer	A photo album of family and friends	A cheeseburger machine	more
13 November 2009	Anthony Julius	Anna Karenina by Leo Tolstoy	San Pellegrino water on tap	more
15 November 2009	Julia Donaldson	Poem for the Day	A piano	more
22 November 2009	Sir Stuart Rose	Wisden Cricketers' Almanack	A power shower with white fluffy towels and constant hot water	more
29 November 2009	Morrissey	The Complete Works of Oscar Wilde	A comfortable bed with many pillows	more
6 December 2009	Baroness Scotland	A bound collection of her family's prose and poetry	A luxurious bathroom	more
13 December 2009	Lord Coe	Such Sweet Thunder: Benny Green on Jazz by Benny Green	A piano and a guide to playing it	more
20 December 2009	Sir Michael Caine	The Fountainhead by Ayn Rand	A large bed with 50% goose down and 50% feather pillows	more
27 December 2009	David Tennant	A la recherche du temps perdu by Marcel Proust	A solar DVD player loaded with the seven series of The West Wing	more

== 2010 ==
Date	Castaway	Book	Luxury	More info
3 January 2010	John Copley	Grove's Operatic Dictionary of Music	His 49-year-old double bed	more
10 January 2010	Mary Portas	The works of Rumi, Persian poet and philosopher	A set of different fragrances from the people she loves	more
17 January 2010	James Ellroy	Libra by Don DeLillo	Sunblock	more
24 January 2010	Frank Warren	Treasure Island by Robert Louis Stevenson	Merlot grapevine	more
31 January 2010	Mary Beard	Treasures of the British Museum by Marjorie Caygill	The Elgin Marbles	more
7 February 2010	Gok Wan	Beautiful Thing by Jonathan Harvey	Lip balm	more
14 February 2010	Jim Al-Khalili	The Road to Reality by Roger Penrose	His acoustic guitar	more
21 February 2010	Clive Woodward	Short Game of Golf by Dave Pelz	A sand wedge and golf ball	more
28 February 2010	June Spencer	Three Men in a Boat by Jerome K. Jerome	A Scrabble board	more
7 March 2010	Maggie Aderin-Pocock	Star Maker by Olaf Stapledon	A telescope	more
14 March 2010	Duncan Bannatyne	The Pillars of the Earth by Ken Follett	A pillow	more
21 March 2010	Frank Cottrell Boyce	The Voyage of the Beagle by Charles Darwin	A ferris wheel	more
28 March 2010	Emma Thompson	Homer's Odyssey	A saucepan - heavy bottomed with a removable handle	more
9 May 2010	Fay Weldon	Kennedy's Latin Primer	A shotgun	more
16 May 2010	Rob Brydon	The collected works of Dylan Thomas	A guitar	more
23 May 2010	Dame Stephanie Shirley	Winnie the Pooh by A. A. Milne	Madonna and Child by Henry Moore	more
30 May 2010	György Pauk	How to be an Alien by George Mikes	An espresso machine	more
13 June 2010	Frank Skinner	Teach yourself French	A ukulele	more
20 June 2010	Lewis Gilbert	A book of poems	A football	more
27 June 2010	Tony Adams	The book of Alcoholics Anonymous	A football	more
4 July 2010	Dame Fanny Waterman	The Diary of a Nobody by George Grossmith	A grand piano and a stool	more
11 July 2010	Dr Gwen Adshead	Biggest book of poetry available	Pen and paper	more
18 July 2010	Tim Robbins	A matchbook	A surfboard	more
25 July 2010	Lynn Barber	The Complete F. Scott Fitzgerald	A cyanide pill	more
1 August 2010	Jimmy Mulville	The Complete Works of P. G. Wodehouse	A solar powered espresso machine	more
8 August 2010	Lord Cobbold	Zanoni by Edward Bulwer-Lytton	A fishing rod	more
15 August 2010	Kathy Burke	The Complete Works of Graham Linehan	A life size laminated photo of James Caan from Dragon's Den	more
26 September 2010	Sir Tom Jones	The Rise and Fall of the British Empire by Lawrence James	A bucket and spade	more
3 October 2010	Johnny Vegas	The Ragged Trousered Philanthropists by Robert Tressell	A kiln	more
10 October 2010	Sarah Doukas	The Songlines by Bruce Chatwin	A photo album of all her family	more
17 October 2010	Michael Mansfield	The Rights of Man by Thomas Paine as his Bible and The Cairo Trilogy by Naguib Mahfouz	A drum kit	more
24 October 2010	Nick Clegg	The Leopard by Giuseppe Tomasi di Lampedusa	A stash of cigarettes	more
31 October 2010	Lang Lang	The Analects of Confucius	Two feathered pillows	more
7 November 2010	Ian McMillan	The Long and The Short of It: Poems 1955–2005 by Roy Fisher	A tandem bike with wooden models of his family on the front	more
19 November 2010	Anna Del Conte	The Leopard by Giuseppe Tomasi di Lampedusa	Extra virgin olive oil	more
21 November 2010	Alice Cooper	Breakfast of Champions by Kurt Vonnegut	An indoor golf driving range	more
28 November 2010	Robert Harris	Scoop by Evelyn Waugh	A nightly fragrant bath	more
5 December 2010	Frances Wood	A copy of Chinese dictionary Cihai, which means Sea of Words	The war memorial outside Euston Station	more
12 December 2010	Sir Torquil Norman	A book of his father's poems and verses	A small still with an ice maker attached to it	more
19 December 2010	Nick Park	A Collins bird book	His own "amazing pair of binoculars"	more
26 December 2010	Sandie Shaw	Lecture on The Heritage of the Ultimate Law of Life by Daisaku Ikeda	Omamori Gohonzon	more

== Notes ==
- Instead of the Bible: The Bhagavad Gita
- Instead of the Bible: The Gathas of Zarathustra
- Instead of the Bible: The Mahābhārata
- Instead of the Bible: The Qur'an
- Instead of the Complete Works of Shakespeare: The Complete Works of Goethe
- No bible
- Instead of the Bible: The Torah
