= Derek Brown =

Derek Brown may refer to:

== Sports ==
- Derek Brown (running back) (born 1971), American football running back for the New Orleans Saints
- Derek Brown (tight end) (born 1970), American football tight end for the New York Giants, Jacksonville Jaguars, Oakland Raiders, and Arizona Cardinals
- Derek Brown (handballer) (born 1970), American handball player
- Derek Brown (rugby union) (1932–2013), Scottish rugby union player

== Others ==
- Derek Brown (editor) (born c. 1944), British editor of the Michelin Red Guides
- Derek Brown (mixologist) (born 1974), American writer and mixologist
- Derek Brown, American multi-instrumentalist for The Flaming Lips
- Derek Brown (musician) (born 1983), American jazz saxophonist
- Derek Brown (politician) (born 1971), American politician in Utah

== See also ==
- Jason Derek Brown (born 1969), American fugitive and accused murderer
- Derrick Brown (disambiguation)
