= Catherine Ricketts =

English missionary

Catherine Maria Ricketts (20 April 1841 – 28 December 1907) was an English missionary.

Born in Westbury-on-Trym, Ricketts moved with her family to Brighton in the 1850s. One day, she sheltered from the rain in the Queen's Road Presbyterian Church and this led her to join the congregation there. She soon became the superintendent of the Presbyterian Girls' Sunday School and in 1863 she founded the Brighton Young Women's Christian Association.

In 1870 school boards were established across England and Wales. Ricketts was elected to the Brighton School Board, one of only nine women elected across the country. She was re-elected in 1873 and 1876, but in 1877 she heard a sermon from William Duffus, a missionary recently returned from China. Inspired, she travelled to Shantou around the turn of 1878 and 1879, where she began missionary work. The Women's Missionary Association of the Presbyterian Church of England was founded in 1879; it promoted her work, and raised money to construct a Bible house in Shantou, where six local students could study.

In 1897 Ricketts moved to Chaozhou, where she worked with Philip Cousland, and ministered to patients in a local Presbyterian hospital. She returned to England on a couple of occasions for medical attention, but in failing health in 1907, she decided to remain in China. She died of pneumonia in 1907.
