= Derrick Brown (disambiguation) =

Derrick Brown (born 1998) is an American football defensive tackle.

Derrick Brown may also refer to:

- Derrick Brown (basketball, born 1973), American basketball player who was best import of the Philippine Basketball Association
- Derrick Brown (basketball, born 1987), American basketball player
- Derrick Brown (long jumper) (born 1968), British long jumper
- Derrick Brown (computer scientist) (born 1969), American engineer
- Derrick C. Brown (born 1973), American poet

== See also ==
- Derek Brown (disambiguation)
