= Gordon Johnson (historian) =

British historian

- Born: 13 September 1943 (age 83)

Academic background
- Education: Trinity College, Cambridge

Academic work
- Discipline: History
- School or tradition: Cambridge School of historiography
- Institutions: Wolfson College, Cambridge
- Main interests: Colonial India; University of Cambridge

Gordon Johnson, FRAS (born 1943) is a British historian of the British Raj.

== Biography ==
Born on 13 September 1943, Johnson was educated at Richmond School in North Yorkshire and Trinity College, Cambridge. He was a fellow at Trinity from 1966 to 1974, and at Selwyn College from 1974 to 1993. He was appointed as a lecturer in Oriental studies at the University of Cambridge in 1974, remaining in that position until 2005.

He was the President of Wolfson College, Cambridge, from 1993 to 2010, and is now an honorary fellow of the college. He was the Director of the Cambridge University Centre of South Asian Studies from 1983 to 2001, and had been a Deputy Vice-Chancellor of the university from 2002 to 2010.

Gordon served as the first Provost of the Gates Cambridge Scholarship Trust from 2000 to 2010.

He was chair of the Syndicate governing Cambridge University Press from 1981 to 2010. In 2009-2010 he was the Sandars Reader in Bibliography and lectured on "From printer to publisher: Cambridge University Press transformed, 1950 to 2010."

He was the President of the Royal Asiatic Society of Great Britain and Ireland, 2015 to 2018 and is currently serving as the Vice President.

He is the general editor of The New Cambridge History of India, published in 1979. This is a series of self-contained volumes covering various aspects and themes of India's past.

== Select publications ==
Dr. Johnson was an editor for the journal Modern Asian Studies from 1978 to 2008.

His publications include Provincial Politics and Indian Nationalism, A Cultural Atlas of India, and University Politics: F M Cornford’s Cambridge and his advice to the young academic politician.

- Johnson, Gordon (21 February 2008). University Politics: F. M. Cornford's Cambridge and His Advice to the Young Academic Politician. Cambridge: Cambridge University Press. ISBN 978-0521723732. A commentary on Cornford's 1908 book Microcosmographia Academica.
