= Joseph L. Henderson =

American physician (1903–2007)

- Born: Joseph Lewis Henderson; August 31, 1903; Elko, Nevada
- Died: November 17, 2007 (aged 104); Greenbrae, California
- Education: Princeton University (B.A. 1927); St Bartholomew's Hospital
- Spouse: Helena Darwin Cornford (m. 1934; died 1996)
- Scientific career
- Fields: Pychotherapy, psychoanalysis
- Workplaces: C.G. Jung Institute of San Francisco

Joseph Lewis Henderson (August 31, 1903 – November 17, 2007) was an American physician and a Jungian psychologist. Called by some the “Dean of American analytical psychologists", he was a co-founder of the C.G. Jung Institute in San Francisco and continued in private practice into his 102nd year. When he died, at the age of 104, he was "the last of the first generation of Jungian analysts who had their primary analysis with Jung."

== Early life and education ==
Henderson was born on August 31, 1903, in Elko, Nevada to one of the small town's leading families; his relatives were ranchers, businessmen, professionals, and his ancestors were early settlers in the area. His great-grandfather, Lewis Rice Bradley, a self-made cattle baron, emigrated west from Missouri and beczme the second governor of Nevada. Three decades later Henderson's uncle, Charles Henderson, was appointed, then elected Senator from Nevada became chairman of the Reconstruction Finance Corporation, and as a result of the developmental assistance provided by that agency to southern Nevada, the city of Henderson, Nevada, was named after him. In Elko itself, the five-story Henderson Bank Building is still the tallest building. It opened in 1929 to house the bank that Henderson's grandfather, Jefferson Henderson, founded in 1880. Jefferson, a pharmacist from Missouri, had become Bradley's son-in-law in California, having married Sarah Bradley before the two families moved to Elko in 1919. This first generation of Hendersons became so distinguished that, according to Joseph Henderson, William Jennings Bryan, in town on a lecture circuit, eulogized the recently deceased Sarah Henderson, wife of Jefferson, as "an important member of the Henderson and Bradley families, well known for having contributed so much to the founding and development of Elko County and the State of Nevada."

Although Henderson left Elko relatively early, the small town left a mark with him; he once told a colleague, psychotherapist C. Jess Groesbeck, one time director of the Utah State Mental Hospital, that "his Elko heritage was so significant to him that it came up frequently in his dreams while in analysis with Jung." After achieving fame within the field with his work on myths of initiation, a colleague dubbed him "the shaman from Elko", and that later became the title of the festschrift in his honor edited by Gareth Hill in 1991.

Henerson was the middle of three children born to John Henderson and Maude Henley Henders. His sister Marjorie was eight years older than him and his brother John Jr. nine years younger. Maude Henley hailed from Red Bluff, California, where her father was a mining engineer, but he died when she was young, leaving her an orphan. Raised by her aunts, she studied to be a teacher, and moved to Elko in 1891 to begin her career. John Henderson was groomed to be a banker and took over as president when his father died. He also, with his brother Charles and a third partner, formed the Henderson-Griswold Livestock Company, which owned three cattle and two sheep ranches; John acted as vice-president.

Henderson father's other brother, Joseph Jefferson Henderson, was an ophthomologist who treated him for a serious eye infection when he was three months old. His uncle was able to save the sight in only one eye, with permanently impaired his depth vision in the other. Years later, Jung explained that the disability "enhanced his inner vision and his interest in dreams and symbols."

A significant part of Henderson's professional work later dealt with the symbols, rites and belief structure of the American Indian. When Henderson lived in Elko living Indians were "part of the landscape." Natives from a village just outside the town came into Elko to market, and as a boy, an "old Indian woman" looked after him.

Henderson spent the summers of his youth performing chores on the family ranch. His visual impairment, however, made doubtful the possibility that he would eventually manage this family business. Indeed, a colleague concluded that "in the ranching community in which he was raised, [it] hampered typical male development." His father, therefore, groomed him to become his successor at the bank and early gave him jobs there to prepare him. While Joseph cooperated, privately he was "profoundly and benignly uninterested."

Henderson's aunt (his father's sister-in-law, Ethel Smith Henderson) was instrumental in guiding him, from an early age, toward intellectual pursuits. As a result of her urging, Henderson was sent to Lawrenceville Academy in Mercer County, New Jersey. At Lawrenceville Henderson came into contact with the time with intellectuals who would have a significant contribution to modern culture. Thornton Wilder, for example, was Henderson's French tutor. (Wilder wrote his first novel, The Cabala and received the Pulitzer Prize for his second one, The Bridge of San Luis Rey.)

Henderson remained in New Jersey for college, attending Princeton University, graduating with a B.A. in French literature in 1925.

He took a medical degree at St Bartholomew's Hospital, London, in 1938.

== Career ==
Henderson practiced in San Francisco, where he founded the Jung Institute of San Francisco, of which he was the president.

== Personal life and death ==
In 1934, he married Helena Cornford, a daughter of Francis Cornford and Frances (née Darwin), herself granddaughter of Charles Darwin. She was 10 years younger than he but predeceased him by 13 years.

Henderson died in 2007 from complications from pneumonia.

== Scholarship and writings ==
In 1963, The Wisdom of the Serpent, a book he co-authored with Maud Oakes, was published. The work, which canvasses mythologems throughout the world concerning death, finds a Jungian pattern in which the acceptance of the cyclical patterns of death and rebirth allows initiates to transcend the fear of mortality.

== Principal publications ==
- "Initiation Rites," Papers of the Analytical Psychology Club of New York. No. 3 (1939)
- "The Drama of Love and Death," Spring (1944), pp. 62–74.
- "Resolution of the Transference in light of C.G. Jung's Psychology," Acta Psychotherapeutica, Psychomatica et Orthopaedagogica, Vol. 2 (1954), pp. 267–83.
- "Analysis of Transference in Analytical Psychology," American Journal of Psychotherapy, Vol. 9 (1955), PP. 640–56.
- "Psychological Commentary" in Margaret Schevill Link, The Pollen Path: A Collection of Navajo Myths (Stanford, California: Stanford University Press, 1956) LCCN 56-7272.
- with Maud Oakes, The Wisdom of the Serpent: The Myths of Death, Rebirth, and Resurrection (Princeton, New Jersey: Princeton University Press, 1963) LCCN 63-18189.
- “Ancient Myths and Modern Man” in Carl Jung (ed.), Man and His Symbols, 104–157 (Garden City, New York: Doubleday & Co., 1964) OCLC 69678785.
- Thresholds of Initiation (Middletown, Connecticut: Wesleyan University Press, 1967) LCCN 67-24110.
- "Transcendence: Symbols of Man's Search for Self," Psychological Perspectives, Vol 1, nol. 1 (March 1970), pp. 34–42.
- "The Psychic Activity of Dreaming," Psychological Perspectives, Vol. 3, no. 2 (September 1972) pp. 99–111.
- "The Picture Method in Jungian Psychotherapy," Art Psychotherapy, Vol. 1, no. 2 (1973), pp. 135–140.
- "Books: Analytical Psychology in England," Psychological Perspectives, Vol. 6, no. 2 (September 1975), pp. 197–203.
- "Individual lives in a changing society," Psychological Perspectives, Vol. 8, no. 2 (September 1977), pp. 126–142.
- "Dreams of Nazi Germany." Psychological Perspectives, Vol. 9, no. 1 (March 1978), pp. 7–12.
- "America, and the language of individuation," Psychological Perspectives, Vol. 12, no. 1 (March 1981), pp. 78–88.
- Cultural Attitudes in Psychological Perspective (Toronto, Ontario: Inner City Books, 1984).
- "A Space of Consciousness," The San Francisco Jung Institute Library Journal, Vol 5, no. 1 (September 1984), pp. 14–19.
- "The Spirit of Abstract Art," The San Francisco Jung Institute Library Journal, Vol. 8, no. 1 (September 1988), pp. 7–16.
- "Forward" to Neil Russack, Against the Cage: Animal Guides in Life, Myth and Dream: An Analyst's Notebook (Toronto, Ontario: Inner City Books, 2002)
- Shadow and Self: Selected Papers in Analytical Psychology (Wilmette, Illinois: Chiron Publications, 1990) ISBN 0933029330.
- with Dyane N. Sherwood, Transformation of the Psyche: The Symbolic Alchemy of the Splendor Solis (Hove and New York: Brunner-Routledge, 2003) ISBN 0203502108.
