= Oslo Court =

Building in London, England

Coordinates: 51°31′59″N 0°10′01″W

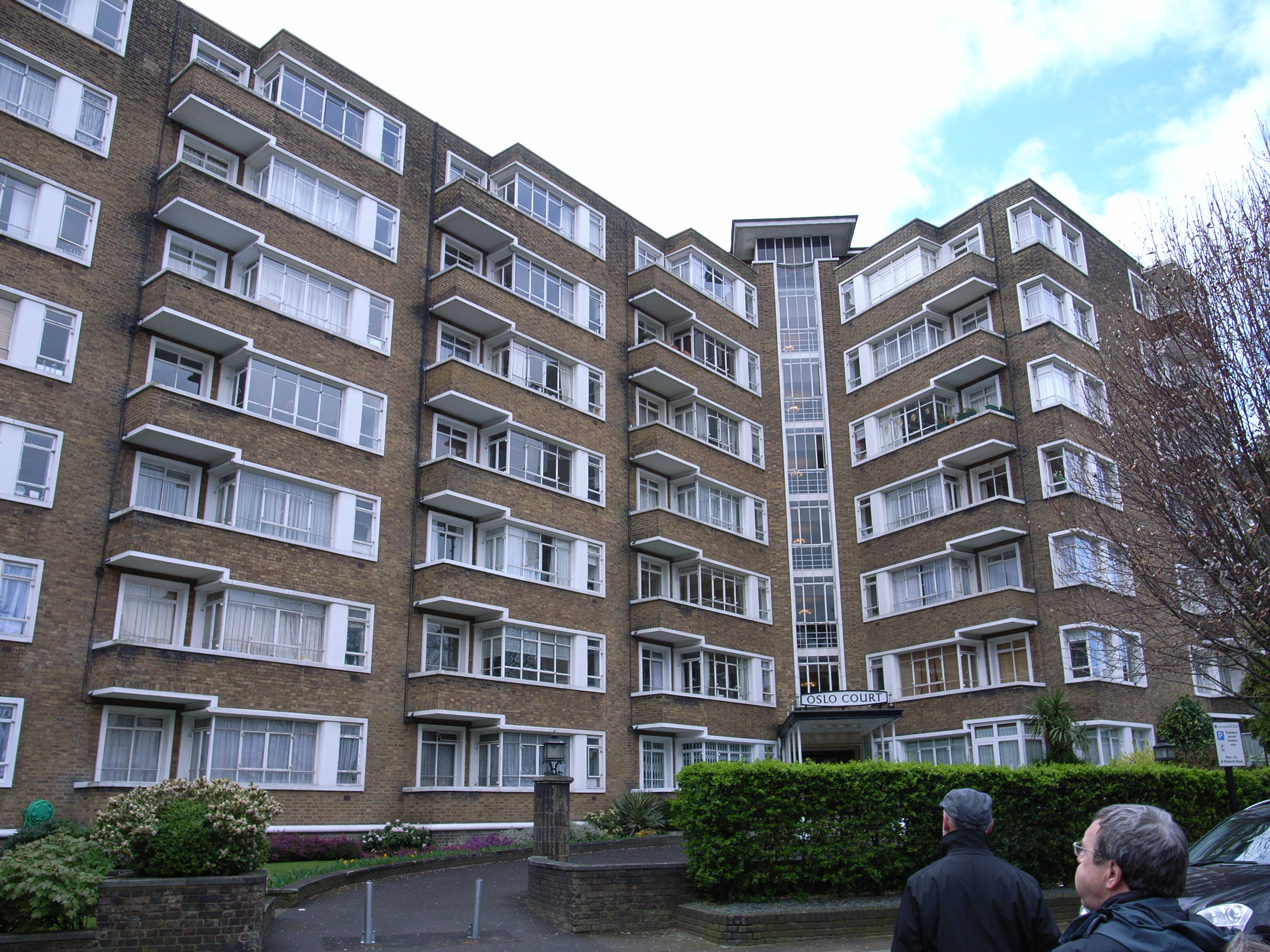
- Interactive map of the Oslo Court area

General information
- Location: London, United Kingdom

Design and construction
- Architect: Robert Atkinson

Oslo Court is a block of flats on Prince Albert Road in St John's Wood, London. Built around 1937, it was designed by architect Robert Atkinson in the International Modern style and is Grade II listed.

== Oslo Court Restaurant ==
The ground floor of the building is Oslo Court Restaurant. It is known for serving traditional food rooted in 1970s and 1980s French-British cuisine. A 2021 survey of reviews rated its Egyptian-born waiter Neil Heshmat, who had worked at the restaurant since 1976, as the most popular waiter in the country, noting that he had personally been praised by 13 reviews in national newspapers since 2006. The restaurant and Heshmat's service was also selected as a luxury by Matt Lucas on Desert Island Discs in 2006.
