= Conduit Head =

House in Cambridge, England

Coordinates: 52.215650°N 0.090950°E

Conduit Head is a 1910 house located off the Madingley Road (A1303) on the western outskirts of Cambridge, England. Built in 1910, it was designed by Harry Redfern for Francis Darwin, and was built for Darwin's daughter Frances on the occasion of her marriage to F. M. Cornford. The architectural historians Simon Bradley and Nikolaus Pevsner describe the house as "gabled, rural and relaxed".

== History ==
The house was built in 1910 as a wedding gift from Francis Darwin (third son of Charles Darwin and Emma) to his daughter, Frances Crofts Darwin, for her marriage to Francis Cornford. It was designed by Harry Redfern and its name was carved by Eric Gill.

Conduit Head was owned by Sir Peter Lachmann (1931–2020), Sheila Joan Smith Professor of Immunology at the University of Cambridge and a fellow of Christ's College, and his wife Sylvia.

== Name ==
A conduit head, a square stone building of 3 m^{2}, stands in the garden behind the house. It might be the original Trinity Head Conduit, constructed in 1327, which served as the main water supply for the Franciscan friary in the centre of Cambridge, Cambridge Greyfriars.
