= Regent Cinema =

Cinema in Brighton, England

Coordinates: 50.824°N 0.143°W

The Regent Cinema in 1923

The Regent Cinema was a cinema in Brighton, England. It was opened by Provincial Cinematograph Theatres on 27 July 1921 and was one of that company's first super cinemas. It was demolished in 1974.

== Design ==

The building was designed by architect Robert Atkinson in the art deco style, with interiors by Walpole Champneys and murals by Walter Bayes. The proscenium was designed by Lawrence Preston of Brighton College of Art. There was one screen, with 2,024 seats.

== Location ==
The Regent Cinema was located on Queen's Road in Brighton, on the site of the historic Unicorn Inn (which was built in 1597 and demolished in 1920.)

== History ==
In 1923 the building expanded with a Georgean Restaurant with orchestra, Ship Cafe and upstairs dance hall. In January 1929, the cinema was closed for 18 months due to fire damage on the stage end and auditorium. In July 1967 the ballroom was converted to a bingo hall.

The cinema closed on 14 April 1973, with the final showing being Cabaret. It was demolished in 1974, the site being occupied by a department store.
