= Nick Danziger =

British photographer and travel writer

Nick Danziger HonFRPS CF (born 22 April 1958) is a British photographer, film maker and travel writer.

== Early life ==
Danziger was born in Marylebone, London but grew up in Monaco and Switzerland.

== Work ==
Danziger attended The Chelsea School of Art in London, where he earned an MA in Fine Art.

In 1982 he received a Churchill Fellowship which enabled him to spend 18 months on the ancient Silk Route from Turkey to China, disguised as a local traveller, taking photographs which resulted in his book Danziger's Travels. Danziger has since travelled the world taking photographs and making documentary films. Most of his work is based on people living in difficult circumstances, particularly young people. His photographs have appeared in newspapers and magazines worldwide, toured museums and galleries internationally, and are held in numerous museum collections.

For The British, Danziger created a photographic documentary in black-and-white images. From the halls of Westminster to inner-city communities beset by crime and unemployment, the exhibition depicted both the traditions and reality of life in Great Britain in the 1990s for a range of social classes.

Through individual and personal stories, Behind the Headlines – Afghan Lives investigated a country often in the news but little understood by those outside its borders. For Revisited, in 2010 he retraced his steps from 2005 to find out what has happened to the women and children he met.

Eleven Women Facing War tells eleven stories of women from Afghanistan, Sierra Leone, Colombia, the Balkans, Israel and the Palestinian Territories. Danziger initially photographed these women in conflict zones for an International Committee of the Red Cross study in 2001. Ten years later, he set out to find each one to learn what had become of their lives.

In 2000, the United Nations' eight Millennium Development Goals were put in place to achieve universal primary education, reduce child mortality and improve maternal health. Danziger travelled to eight of the world's poorest countries and met individuals living in extreme poverty. Through the stories of 40 men, women and children he sought to document the progress being made towards meeting the eight goals.

For Blair at War, in March 2003 Danziger and Peter Stothard began a 30-day study of a Prime Minister at war, with access to Tony Blair's "inner circle" as he confronted an angry nation and deployed British forces against Iraq.

Mana was made inside the sacred space of an All Blacks camp—revealing the highs and lows of New Zealand's iconic rugby team.

Danziger appeared on BBC Radio 4's Desert Island Discs on 16 March 2003. In 2007 he was the guest on Radio 4's Great Lives nominating Tintin although "Tintin breaks all this programme's rules. He didn't exist, and he hasn't died."

== Publications ==
- Danziger's Travels: Beyond Forbidden Frontiers. Reissued. 1993 ISBN 978-0-586-08706-0.
- Danziger's Adventures: From Miami to Kabul. Reissued. 2009. ISBN 978-0-586-09081-7.
- Missing Lives. Stockport: Dewi Lewis, 2010. ISBN 978-1-904587-87-3.
- Danziger's Britain: A Journey to the Edge. New edition. 2011. ISBN 978-0-00-638249-2.
- Mana. Hodder Mao / Hachette NZ, 2010. ISBN 978-1-86971-221-1.
- Onze Femmes Face à la Guerre = Eleven Women Facing War. Lieux Dits, 2011. ISBN 978-2-922892-56-7.
- Above the Line: People and Places in the DPRK (North Korea). British Council, 2014. ISBN 978-0863557286.

== Awards ==
- 2007: Honorary Fellowship of The Royal Photographic Society

== Exhibitions ==
- Blair at War
  - National Portrait Gallery, London, 2001
  - Canadian War Museum, Ottawa, Ontario, Canada, 2008
  - Simon Fraser University, Teck Gallery, Vancouver, British Columbia, Canada, 2008/09
  - London Gallery West, University of Westminster, London, 2010
- Eight-Millennium Development Goals
  - County Hall, London, 2005
  - National Library, Singapore, 2006
  - The Photographic Society of Singapore, Singapore, 2006
  - Wat Phnom Exhibition Centre, Phnom Penh, Cambodia, 2006
  - Foreign Correspondents' Club of Thailand, Bangkok, Thailand, 2006
  - Foreign Correspondents' Club of South Asia, Delhi, India, 2006
  - Monasterio San Nicolo, Lido, Venice, Italy, 2007
  - Embassy of the United Kingdom, Budapest, Budapest, Hungary, 2008
  - International Business School, Budapest, Hungary, 2008
  - Centre Culturel Alban Minville, Toulouse, France, 2009
- Behind the Headlines – Afghan Lives
  - Host Gallery, London, 2006
  - Tron Gallery, Glasgow, 2007
  - Canada House, London, 2007
- Between Heaven and Earth: A Journey Through Christian Ethiopia
  - Royal Geographical Society, London, 2009
  - École Biblique et Archéologique Française de Jérusalem, Jerusalem, 2010
  - A. M. Qattan Foundation, Ramallah, 2010
  - The French Cultural Center, Nablus, 2010
  - Dar Annadwa, The International Center of Bethlehem, Bethlehem, 2010
  - Centre Culturel Français Romain Gary de Jérusalem, Jerusalem, 2010
  - National Museum of Ethiopia, Addis Ababa, 2010
  - Lalibela World Cultural Centre, Lalibela, Ethiopia, 2012
- Women Facing War, Théâtre de la Photographie et de l'image, Nice, France, 2008/09
- The Historic Neighbourhoods and Houses of Herat and Kabul, Afghanistan, Musée des Arts Asiatiques, Nice, France, 2009/10
- Missing Lives
  - Riverside Walkway', Gabriel's Wharf, London, 2010
  - Kalemegdan Fortress, Belgrade, Serbia, 2010
  - Trg Djece, Sarajevo, Bosnia-Hercegovina, 2010
  - Mother Teresa Square, Pristina, Kosovo, 2010
  - Spanski Trg, Mostar, Bosnia-Hercegovina, 2010
  - Bana Milosavljevica, Banja Luka, Republika Srbska, 2010
  - Trg Strossmayer, Zagreb, Croatia, 2010
  - Strasbourg, France, 2010
  - Place du Luxembourg, Brussels, Belgium, 2010
  - Canadian War Museum, Ottawa, Ontario, Canada, 2011
  - Multicultural Hub, Melbourne, 2011
  - Waisenhausplatz, Bern, Switzerland, 2011
- Guerre et Paix: Femmes dans le XXIeme siecle, Salle d'Exposition du Quai Antoine 1er, Monaco, 2011
- Mana, Britomart, Auckland, New Zealand, 2011
- Onze Femmes face à la Guerre – Eleven Women Facing War
  - Hôtel de Ville, Paris, 2011
  - Canadian War Museum, Ottawa, Ontario, Canada, 2013
  - Founders' Gallery, The Military Museums, Calgary, Alberta, Canada, 2013
- Galerie Ferrero, Nice, France, 2012
- Revisited
  - Royal Geographical Society, London, 2011/12
  - The Brindley, Runcorn, 2013
