= Christopher Cornford =

- Born: Christopher Francis Cornford; 9 February 1917
- Died: 8 April 1993 (aged 76); Cambridgeshire
- Occupations: Artist; Writer
- Relatives: John Cornford (brother); Adam Cornford (son)

Christopher Francis Cornford (9 February 1917 – 8 April 1993) was a British artist and writer. A Communist Party member of the 1930s, after World War II he taught at University of Durham, Cambridge and the Royal College of Art.

== Life ==
He was the son of Francis Cornford, and his wife Frances Cornford (née Darwin). Through his mother, he was a great-grandson of the naturalist Charles Darwin. His elder brother was the poet, communist, and Spanish Civil War victim John Cornford. His son is Adam Cornford, British poet, librettist, and essayist.

He was active in politics until into the late 1980s, in the Campaign for Nuclear Disarmament and its offshoot Cambridge Against Missile Bases, and in the environmental movement as a signatory of the Blueprint for Survival and an early member of the Ecology (later Green) Party in the UK.

Cornford died on 8 April 1993 in Cambridgeshire.
