= Robert Atkinson (architect) =

English architect

Robert Atkinson OBE
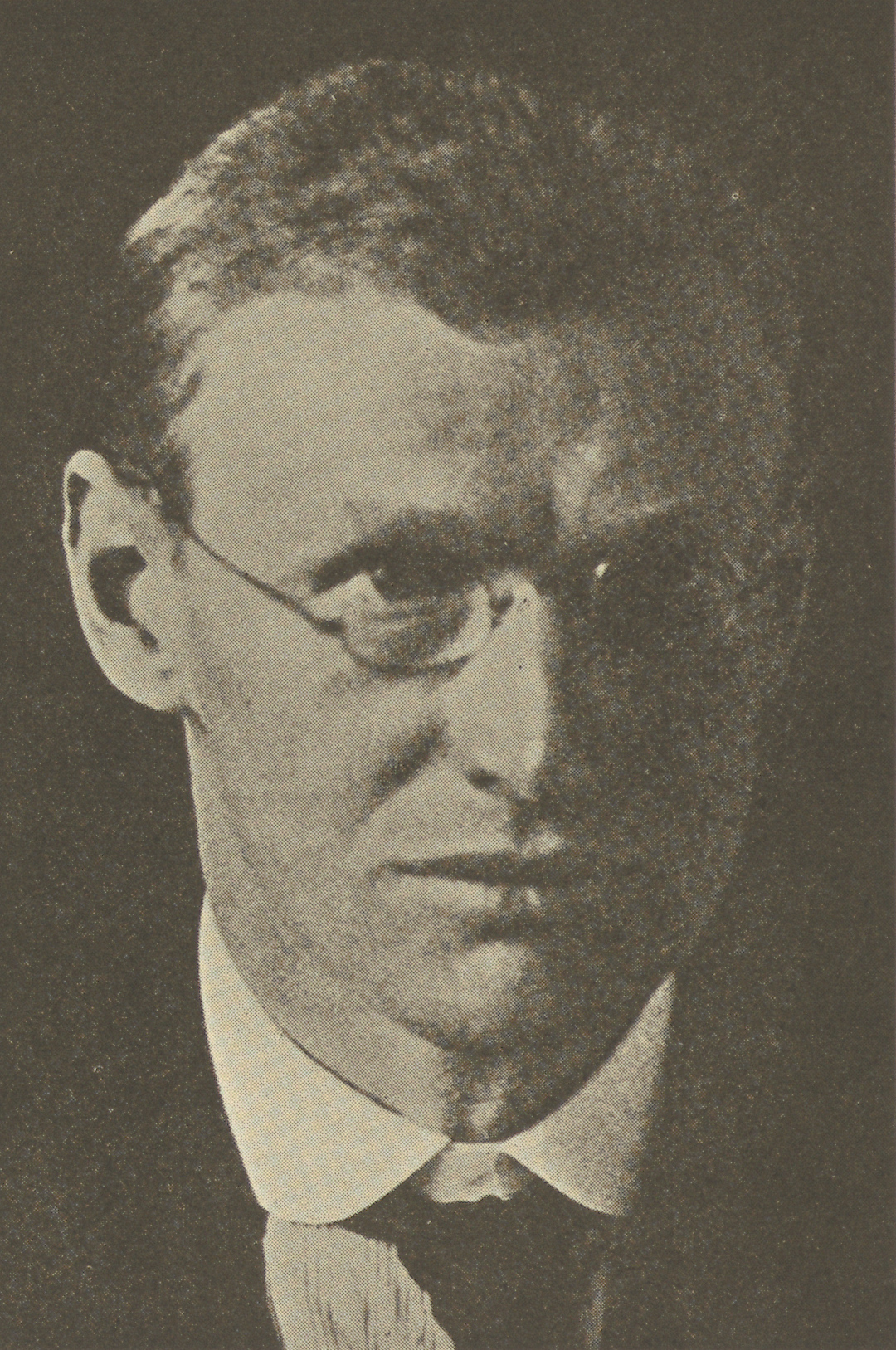
- Born: 1 August 1883; Wigton, Cumberland, England
- Died: 26 December 1952 (aged 69); London, England
- Education: University College, Nottingham
- Occupation: Architect

Robert Atkinson OBE (1 August 1883 – 26 December 1952) was an English architect primarily working in the Art Deco style.

== Life ==
Atkinson was born in Wigton in Cumberland and studied at University College Nottingham, and afterwards in Paris, Italy and America. He was a talented draughtsman and worked for C. E. Mallows from 1905. In turn he illustrated many of the town planning and garden designs of Thomas Hayton Mawson, included in the latter's books The Art and Craft of Garden Making, and Civic Art (1911), to which he contributed a number of skilled perspective views.

Atkinson experimented with various styles, including the American Beaux-Arts and oriental, in search of a new modern style. He is known for his cinema designs in English cities, including the 3,000 seat Regent Cinema, Brighton (built 1919–1923; demolished 1974). Described as the "first luxury cinema on the American model", it was really a recreation centre, in which one could also "take tea", eat or dance. Atkinson is also well known for the art deco interior of the Daily Express Building, London, in 1931–2, which has been described as the "best surviving art deco interior in Britain".

Atkinson did a lot of work in the Art Deco style, but found that commercial considerations meant that he had to forgo his artistic aspirations. Much of his work is not remembered or not well regarded including the government rehousing scheme built in 1946 to 1950 in Gibraltar and government offices in Marsham Street, Westminster, which were actually not built as he intended, as the design was changed after he died.

Atkinson was appointed an OBE in 1951, shortly before his death.

== Partial list of works ==
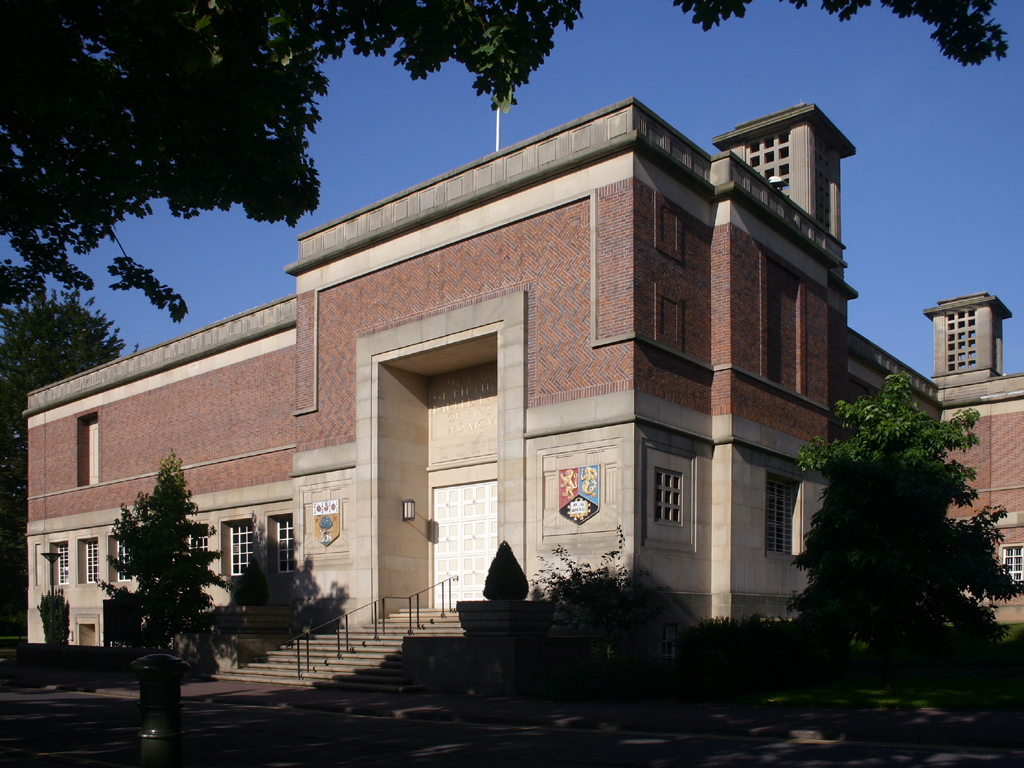
Barber Institute of Fine Arts, Birmingham

The following is a selection of Atkinson's works:

- All Hallows Twickenham (incorporating portions moved from All Hallows Lombard Street)
- Barber Institute of Fine Arts, University of Birmingham (RIBA Bronze Medal, 1946)
- Canadian Red Cross Memorial Hospital, Taplow, Bucks (in grounds of Cliveden)
- Cannon Royal Cinema, Charing Cross Road, London
- City Hall, Norwich (site plan)
- Croydon 'B' power station
- Oslo Court, St John's Wood, London
- Daily Express Building, London (lobby interior)
- Eros Cinema, Shaftesbury Avenue, London (demolished)
- Gresham Hotel and Clerys department store O'Connell Street, Dublin
- 30 Horniman Drive, Forest Hill, London (private residence)
- Regent Cinema, Brighton (demolished)
- Ridgehanger, 7 Hillcrest Road, Ealing, London. Grade II listed detached private residence
- Stockleigh Hall, Regent's Park Estate, Camden Borough, London (RIBA Bronze Medal, 1937)
- Wallington Town Hall
