= Derrick Brown (computer scientist) =

American computer scientist

- Born: 1969 (age 56–57)
- Occupation: Computer Scientist

Derrick Brown was an American Computer Scientist. Brown helped create "the Black equivalent of the original Yahoo index", called Universal Black Pages.

Brown was born in Elloree, South Carolina in 1969.
