= Frances Cornford =

English poet (1886–1960)

- Born: 30 March 1886
- Died: 30 August 1960 (aged 74); Cambridge, England
- Occupation: Poet
- Spouse: Francis Cornford (m. 1909)
- Children: 5, including John Cornford, Christopher Cornford

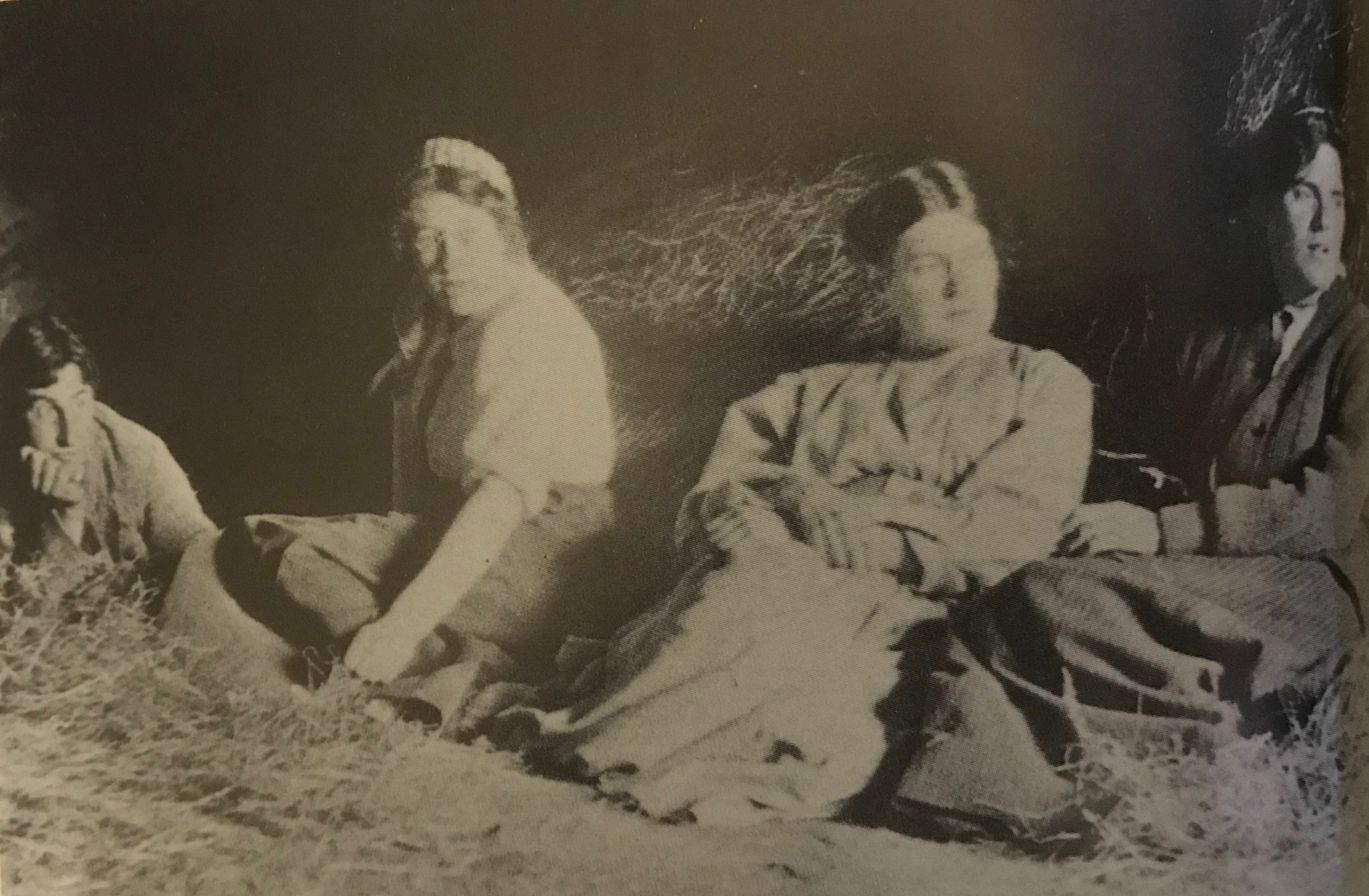
Jacques Raverat, Ka Cox, Gwen Raverat and Frances Cornford in a Norfolk barn.

Frances Crofts Cornford (née Darwin; 30 March 1886 – 19 August 1960) was an English poet.

== Biography ==
She was the daughter of the botanist Francis Darwin and Newnham College fellow Ellen Wordsworth Crofts (1856–1903), and born into the Darwin–Wedgwood family. She was a granddaughter of the naturalist Charles Darwin. Her older half-brother was the golf writer Bernard Darwin. She was brought up in Cambridge, among a dense social network of aunts, uncles, and cousins, and was educated privately. Because of the similarity of her first name, her father's and her husband's, she was known to her family before her marriage as "FCD" and after her marriage as "FCC" and her husband Francis Cornford was known as "FMC". Her father Sir Francis Darwin, a son of Charles Darwin, yet another 'Francis', was known to their family as "Frank", or as "Uncle Frank".

She died of heart failure at her home in Cambridge, on 19 August 1960. She is buried at the Parish of the Ascension Burial Ground in Cambridge, where she is in the same grave as her father Sir Francis Darwin. Her mother Ellen Wordsworth Darwin, née Crofts, is buried in St Andrew's churchyard in Girton, Cambridgeshire.

== Personal life ==
In 1909, Frances Darwin married Francis Cornford, a classicist and poet. They had five children:

- Helena Cornford (1913–1996); married Joseph L. Henderson in 1934
- John Cornford (1915–1936), a poet and Communist who was killed in the Spanish Civil War
- Christopher Cornford (1917–1993), an artist and writer
- Hugh Wordsworth Cornford (1921–1997), medical doctor
- Ruth Clare (1924–1992); married Cecil Hall Chapman, the son of Sydney Chapman in 1947.

== Works ==
Frances Cornford published several books of verse, including her debut (as "F.C.D"), The Holtbury Idyll (1908), Poems (1910), Spring Morning (1915), Autumn Midnight (1923), and Different Days (1928). Mountains and Molehills (1935) was illustrated with woodcuts by her cousin Gwen Raverat.

She wrote poems including "The Guitarist Tunes Up":

With what attentive courtesy he bent
Over his instrument;
Not as a lordly conqueror who could
Command both wire and wood,
But as a man with a loved woman might
Inquiring with delight
What slight essential things she had to say
Before they started, he and she, to play.

One of Frances Cornford's poems was a favourite of Philip Larkin and his lover Maeve Brennan. "All Souls' Night" uses the superstition that a dead lover will appear to a still faithful partner on that November date. Maeve, many years after Larkin's death, would re-read the poem on All Souls:

My love came back to me
Under the November tree
Shelterless and dim.
He put his hand upon my shoulder,
He did not think me strange or older,
Nor I him.

Although the myth enhances the poem, it can be read as the meeting of older, former lovers.

=== "To a Fat Lady Seen from the Train" ===
Cornford is possibly best remembered for her triolet poem "To a Fat Lady Seen from the Train" in Poems of 1910.

O why do you walk through the fields in gloves,
Missing so much and so much?
O fat white woman whom nobody loves,
Why do you walk through the fields in gloves,
When the grass is soft as the breast of doves
And shivering-sweet to the touch?
O why do you walk through the fields in gloves,
Missing so much and so much?

To which G. K. Chesterton replied in "The Fat Lady Answers", in his Collected Poems of 1927:

Why do you rush through the field in trains,
Guessing so much and so much.
Why do you flash through the flowery meads,
Fat-head poet that nobody reads;
And why do you know such a frightful lot
About people in gloves as such? ...

Earlier, in 1910, A. E. Housman had written a parody in a private letter:

O why do you walk through the fields in boots,
Missing so much and so much?
O fat white woman whom nobody shoots,
Why do you walk through the fields in boots,
When the grass is soft as the breast of coots ...

The first lines of this poem were spoken by a character in Agatha Christie's 1939 novel Murder is Easy.

Elizabeth Goudge quotes the poem "The Country Bedroom" in her autobiography, The Joy of the Snow at the end of Chap XIV, p 252, when Goudge is describing finding her final home "Rose Cottage".

My room's a square and candle-lighted boat,
In the surrounding depths of night afloat;
My windows are the portholes, and the seas
The sound of rain on the dark apple-trees.

Seamonster-like beneath, an old horse blows
A snort of darkness from his sleeping nose,
Below, among drowned daisies. Far off, hark!
Far off one owl amidst the waves of dark.

== See also ==
- Conduit Head
