= Microcosmographia Academica =

1908 pamphlet by F.M. Cornford

Microcosmographia Academica ("A Study of a Tiny Academic World" in Latin) is a short pamphlet on university politics written by F. M. Cornford and published in 1908. It has acquired a small cult following as a pessimistic view of academic politics presented in a readable and lively style, and is best known for its discussion of such principles as "The (Thin End of the) Wedge" and "The Dangerous Precedent":

The Principle of the Wedge is that you should not act justly now for fear of raising expectations that you may act still more justly in the future – expectations which you are afraid you will not have the courage to satisfy. A little reflection will make it evident that the Wedge argument implies the admission that the persons who use it cannot prove that the action is not just. If they could, that would be the sole and sufficient reason for not doing it, and this argument would be superfluous.

The Principle of the Dangerous Precedent is that you should not now do an admittedly right action for fear you, or your equally timid successors, should not have the courage to do right in some future case, which, ex hypothesi, is essentially different, but superficially resembles the present one. Every public action which is not customary, either is wrong, or, if it is right, is a dangerous precedent. It follows that nothing should ever be done for the first time.

The book is also known for Cornford's definition, in the preface to a later edition, of propaganda as: "that branch of the art of lying which consists in very nearly deceiving your friends without quite deceiving your enemies".

Although written for an audience familiar with the procedures of the University of Cambridge at the turn of the twentieth century, it could apply to any political system and is similar to the British television comedy Yes Minister; some of the dialogue in the "Doing the Honours" episode closely follows its text.

Christopher Hitchens quotes several parts and reflects upon this essay in his book Letters to a Young Contrarian, introducing it to the reader by quoting the above Principles of Wedge and Dangerous Precedent. "F.M. Cornford [was] a witty Cambridge academic of the Edwardian period who had become used to every possible High Table euphemism and Senior Common Room obfuscation. He anatomised them all in his 1908 treatise, Microcosmographia Academia. The passage I’ll give you is from chapter 7, entitled "Arguments": There is only one argument for doing something; the rest are arguments for doing nothing. Since the stone-axe fell into disuse at the close of the neolithic age, two other arguments of universal application have been added to the rhetorical armoury by the ingenuity of mankind. [...]"

Gordon Johnson included it in his 2008 book University Politics: F. M. Cornford's Cambridge and his Advice to the Young Academic Politician about the politics of the University of Cambridge, preceded by a description of the background against which Cornford was writing.
