= F. M. Cornford =

English classical scholar (1874–1943)

F. M. Cornford FBA
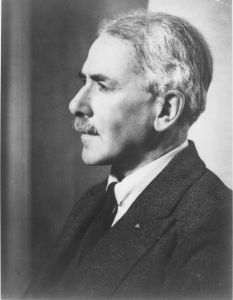
- Born: Francis Macdonald Cornford; 27 February 1874; Eastbourne, England
- Died: 3 January 1943 (aged 68); Cambridge, England
- Spouse: Frances Cornford (m. 1909)
- Children: Helena Darwin Cornford; John Cornford; Christopher Cornford; Hugh Cornford; Ruth Chapman

Academic background
- Education: Trinity College, Cambridge
- Influences: Gilbert Murray; A. W. Verrall

Academic work
- Discipline: Classics
- Institutions: Trinity College, Cambridge
- Notable students: W. K. C. Guthrie

Francis Macdonald Cornford FBA (27 February 1874 – 3 January 1943) was an English classical scholar and translator known for work on ancient philosophy, notably Plato, Parmenides, Thucydides, and ancient Greek religion. Frances Cornford, his wife, was a noted poet. Due to the similarity in their names, he was known in the family as "FMC" and his wife as "FCC".

== Early life and family ==
Cornford was born in Eastbourne, Sussex, on 27 February 1874. He attended St Paul's School, London.

In 1909 Cornford married the poet Frances Darwin, daughter of Sir Francis Darwin and Ellen Wordsworth Darwin, née Crofts, and a granddaughter of Charles Darwin. They had five children:

- Helena (1913–1994), who married Joseph L. Henderson in 1934
- John (1915–1936), poet and Communist killed in the Spanish Civil War
- Christopher (1917–1993), artist and writer, the father of Adam Cornford
- Hugh Wordsworth (1921–1997), medical doctor
- Ruth Clare (1923–1992), mother of Matthew Chapman

== Career ==
Cornford was educated at Trinity College, Cambridge, where he was a Fellow from 1899 and held a teaching post from 1902. He became the first Laurence Professor of Ancient Philosophy in 1931 and was elected a Fellow of the British Academy in 1937. He used wit and satire to propagate proposals for reforming the teaching of the classics at Cambridge, in Microcosmographia Academica (1908).

Cornford coined the phrase "twin pillars of Platonism", referring to the theory of Forms on the one hand, and, on the other the doctrine of immortality of the soul.

== Death ==
He died on 3 January 1943 in his home, Conduit Head in Cambridge. He was cremated at Cambridge Crematorium on 6 January 1943.

== Works ==
- Cornford, Francis Macdonald (1904). "Sibyl Fresco at Cortina d'Ampezzo". Proceedings of the Cambridge Antiquarian Society. X (4). Cambridge Antiquarian Society: 369–373.
- Thucydides Mythistoricus (1907) put the argument that Thucydides's History of the Peloponnesian War was informed by Thucydides's tragic view.
- From Religion to Philosophy: A Study in the Origins of Western Speculation (1912) sought the deep religious and social concepts that informed the early Greek philosophers. He returned to this in Principium Sapientiae: The Origins of Greek Philosophical Thought (posthumous, 1952).
- Microcosmographia Academica (1908) was an insider's satire on academic politics. It was the source of catch phrases such as the "doctrine of unripeness of time", the "principle of the wedge" and the "principle of the dangerous precedent".
- Before and After Socrates (1932)
- Plato's Cosmology : The Timaeus of Plato. Hackett Publishing Company (1935)
- According to the preface to The Republic of Plato, translated with an introduction and notes (OUP, 1941), it "aims at conveying... as much as possible of the thought of the Republic in the most convenient and least misleading form."

== See also ==
- Jane Ellen Harrison
- Conduit Head
- Esther Salaman

Academic offices
New office	Laurence Professor of Ancient Philosophy; 1930–1939	Succeeded by Reginald Hackforth
