= Hanover Chapel, Brighton =

Chapel in Brighton, East Sussex, England

Coordinates: 50°49′33″N 0°08′31″W

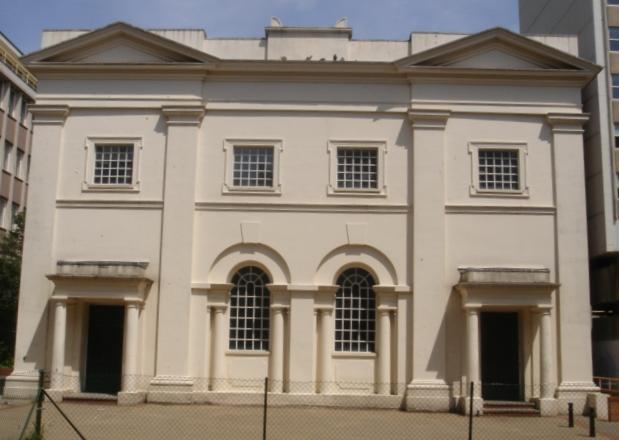
Hanover Chapel in Brighton, 2008

Hanover Chapel, Brighton, was originally a Congregational chapel built in Brighton, East Sussex, in 1825. It was built on land located beside Church Street and North Road for the Rev. James Edwards, a local Presbyterian minister. However, Edwards left for Bognor Regis, where he opened another chapel, also known as Hanover Chapel, in deference to the House of Hanover, the royal house at that time.
