= Adam Cornford =

British poet, journalist, and essayist

- Born: 26 February 1950 (age 76); Newcastle-upon-Tyne, England
- Education: University of California, Santa Cruz
- Occupations: Poet; Journalist; Essayist

Adam Francis Cornford (born 26 February 1950) is a British poet, journalist, and essayist and the great-great-grandson of Charles Darwin. From 1987 to 2008 he led the Poetics Program at New College of California in San Francisco, United States.

== Biography ==
Adam Francis Cornford was born in Newcastle-upon-Tyne, the son of Christopher Cornford and a lineal descendant of naturalist Charles Darwin. Cornford moved to California, United States in 1969. He attended the University of California, Santa Cruz, where he studied with (and was first published by) kayak editor George Hitchcock; and San Francisco State University, where his mentor was the Greek surrealist Nanos Valaoritis. Among his books are four collections of poetry: Shooting Scripts (Black Stone Press, 1978); Animations (City Lights Books, 1988), Decision Forest (Pantograph Press, 1997), and Lalia (Chax Press, 2021). For 21 years, Cornford led the Poetics Program at New College of California in San Francisco.

In 2015, Cornford provided the text for a collaboration with Jonathan Gerken and printer and bookmaker Peter Rutledge Koch, Liber Ignis (2015), a serial documentary poem on the history of copper mining and smelting in Butte, Montana that accompanies historical photographs.

Despite this recent shift in his work, Cornford considers himself a neosurrealist and has written and edited on the subject of surrealism. He shares the surrealist view that the true goal of poetry is what the original group around André Breton called "the total liberation of the mind and of all that resembles it" ("Declaration of January 27, 1925"). He also has translated poetry by the Surrealist Benjamin Perét and the seminal account by Louis Aragon of the early days of the Surrealist group, "A Wave of Dreams" (1925).

From 1987 to 2008, while a core faculty member and program director at New College of California in San Francisco, Cornford worked with Tom Clark, David Meltzer and Gloria Frym to rebuild the graduate Poetics Program. Other notable faculty members during Cornford's tenure included Lyn Hejinian and Juan Felipe Herrera. The innovative program combined a 4-semester core curriculum in the history of English and American poetry from the Renaissance to Modernism with writing seminars, a reading series, and a Visiting Poets program.

As of 2018, Cornford has renewed his association with the cryptographer David Chaum, inventor of digital currency, mix network, multiparty computation, and the "vault" technology underlying blockchain, with whom he has worked as editor/co-writer on numerous projects, including papers for technical journals and Scientific American. Most recently he has collaborated on the documentation and public relations for xx network, which supports the world's first fully private, fully decentralized communications and payment system .

Cornford has published articles about labour movements and political and cultural analyses in Bad Subjects, The Progressive, The Dispatcher (the newspaper of the International Longshore and Warehouse Union) and the underground information workers' magazine Processed World, of which he was a co-editor during 1981–1992 as well as a resident graphic artist and cartoonist. His two longest poems, "Lightning Rod to Storm" in Animations (1988) and "The Snarling Gift" in Terminal Velocities (1993) are both concerned with popular movements for social and environmental justice. The same is true of the two experimental radio theater works he co-authored with Emmy Award-winning composer Daniel Steven Crafts, Fundamentals (an early critical take on fundamentalist "televangelism") and Ad Nauseam (a poetic examination of the deforming effects of commercial saturation on the imagination). There is a strong continuity between his poetic work and his activism, including his work as author and performer for the satirical antiwar street theatre troupe the John Wayne Peace Institute (1980–81) and his participation in Processed World. His work is discussed in this context in the essay by Andrew Joron, "Neo-Surrealism: Or, The Sun at Night".

== Poetry ==
=== Collections and longer works ===
- Lalia (poetry collection). Chax Press, Tucson, Arizona, 2021 ISBN 978-1-946104-27-4
- Liber Ignis (long serial poem to accompany period photographs). Peter Koch Printers, Berkeley, California, 2015
- Decision Forest (poetry collection). Pantograph Press, Berkeley, California, 1997, ISBN 1-880766-15-9.
- 'Round Midnight (long poem chapbook), Altazor Editions, San Francisco, California, 1989.
- Animations (poetry collection), City Lights Books, San Francisco, California, 1988, ISBN 0-87286-208-9.
- Shooting Scripts (poetry collection), Black Stone Press, San Francisco, California, 1978, ISBN 0-686-28251-5.

=== Journals ===
1969–present. Poetry and translations have appeared in:

(Print) Antaeus, Antenym, Bay Guardian, Beatitude, Caliban, City Lights Review, Compact Bone, Coracle, Gallery Works, Gas, Juxta, Mantis, Malthus, Melodeon, Mike & Dale's Younger Poets, The New College Review, Prosodia, Root & Branch, syllogism, Talisman, Terra, Velocities.

(Web): The Alterran Poetry Assemblage #2, The Alterran Poetry Assemblage #3, Angel Poetry, Counterexample Poetics, black fire white fire, Deep Oakland, Duration Press Archive, Facture 1, Facture 2, Five Fingers Review, Issue 16, kayak, Montana Gothic, Orpheus Grid, ‘’The Pedestal Magazine’’, Processed World, ur-vox, MSNBC.com.

=== Anthologies ===
- The Alchemy of Stars: The Rhysling Award Winners Showcase, Science Fiction Poetry Association, US, 2005, ISBN 0-8095-1162-2.
- 2001: A Science Fiction Poetry Anthology. Anamnesis Press, Ridgecrest, California, 2001, ISBN 1-892842-23-8.
- The City Lights Pocket Poets Anthology (different poems in the two editions). City Lights Books, San Francisco, California, 1995–1997.
- Terminal Velocities: An Anthology of Speculative Poetry. ("The Snarling Gift," a 41-page poem). Velocities Publications, Berkeley, California, 1993, ISBN 1-880766-03-5.
- Burning With A Vision: Poetry of Science and the Fantastic. Owlswick Press, Philadelphia, Pennsylvania, 1984, ISBN 0-913896-23-3.

== Poetry teaching – children ==
- "Eating the Yema of the Sol" (six Spanish bilingual poetry lessons for children), ed. and intro., BUSD Publications, Berkeley, California, 1981.
- "These Words Are My Words," with Robert Glück, eds. and intro., (anthology of children's poems from Berkeley Grade 2–3 classes), Poetry Playhouse, Berkeley, California, 1980.

== Selected essays ==
- "Given: An Autobiography" in Linda R. Andres and Marilyn O’Connell Allen, eds., Contemporary Authors Autobiography Series, vol. 28. Gale Research, Inc, Detroit, Michigan, 1997, ISBN 0-7876-1143-3.
- "The Pyramid and the Tree" in Cornford, Decision Forest, op. cit. (and in updated version on Cornford's official website).
- "Colorless All-Color: Notes on White Culture" in Bad Subjects No. 33, Race Issue, Berkeley, California, 1997.
- "Cosmology: Intelligence and Infinity in Language" in Alterran Poetry Assemblage #3, Toronto, Canada, 1996.

== Librettos and other musical texts ==
- "Spider Woman" in From a Distant Mesa, an orchestral song cycle on the Southwest's history and culture, with composer Daniel Steven Crafts, 2007.
- Otter's Odd Adventure (spoken narrative to accompany an orchestral work by composer Daniel Steven Crafts), 2001.
- The Pied Piper of Hamelin (libretto for children's opera based on the poem by Robert Browning, with composer Daniel Steven Crafts), 1992.
- Ad Nauseam (one-hour radio performance work for three actors using sound collage and poetry, with Daniel Steven Crafts, 1985.
- Fundamentals (ninety-minute experimental theatre piece using sound collage, slide projection, and choreopoetry; adapted for radio 1985, with Daniel Steven Crafts, 1984.)
- A Soldier's Tale (futuristic comic reworking of the libretto/narrative for the Igor Stravinsky piece, co-authored and performed with Melinda Gebbie, Daniel Steven Crafts and Michael Peppe, together with the Berkeley Radio Symphony Orchestra under the direction of Kent Nagano), 1984.
- Theater of Operations (experimental theatre, performed with the music group the Funktionaries), 1980–81.

== Reviews ==
- Andrew Joron, "Neo-Surrealism: Or, The Sun at Night", in the critical anthology The World in Time and Space: Towards a History of Innovative American Poetry in Our Time, 1970–2000, Edward Foster and Joseph Donahue, eds., Talisman House, Jersey City, New Jersey, 2002, ISBN 978-0-9744065-2-7.

== Awards ==
- National Endowment of the Arts grant (with Daniel Steven Crafts) for Fundamentals and Ad Nauseam, 1985.
- Rhysling Award for Best Short Poem, "Your Time and You: A Neoprole’s Dating Guide", Science Fiction Poetry Association, 1981.
