= John Cornford =

English poet and communist (1915–1936)

- Cornford in January 1936
- Born: 27 December 1915; Cambridge, England
- Died: 28 December 1936 (aged 21); Lopera, Spain
- Cause of death: Killed in action
- Education: London School of Economics; Trinity College, Cambridge
- Occupation: Poet
- Political party: Communist Party of Great Britain
- Children: 1
- Military career
- Allegiance: Republicans
- Branch: International Brigades
- Service years: 1936
- Conflicts: Spanish Civil War †

Rupert John Cornford (27 December 1915 – 28 December 1936) was an English poet and communist. During the first year of the Spanish Civil War, he was a member of the POUM militia and later the International Brigades. He died while fighting against the Nationalists, at Lopera, near Córdoba.

== Biography ==
Rupert John Cornford was born in Cambridge on 27 December 1915, to Francis Cornford and Frances Cornford (née Darwin). His father was a professor of classics at Trinity College, and his mother was a poet and the granddaughter of Charles Darwin and Emma Darwin. Named after poet and family friend Rupert Brooke, Cornford preferred to use his middle name John.

He was attracted early to left-wing politics. His brother Christopher recalled, "As young as fourteen and a half he became sympathetic to Socialism.... he explained to me the principles of the 'nationalisation of industry' and the injustices of our economic system." In 1931, Cornford joined the Young Communist League in London.

In December 1932 while attending Stowe School, he won an Open Major Scholarship to study history at Trinity College, Cambridge. Rather than finish out the school year at Stowe, he opted to complete his spring and summer terms at the London School of Economics. He matriculated at King's College School, Cambridge in autumn 1933. He quickly became involved with the Cambridge University Socialist Society with his roommate and friend James Klugmann. In 1935, Cornford joined the Communist Party of Great Britain and acquainted himself with party general secretary Harry Pollitt.

While at Cambridge, Cornford began a relationship with Rachel "Ray" Peters, a working-class woman with whom he had a son. A photograph of him with Peters can be found at the National Portrait Gallery, London. He later left Peters and his son for a romance with fellow student and communist activist Margot Heinemann. Together they supported the 1934 hunger marchers who passed through Cambridge en route to London.

In 1936, Cornford obtained a degree in history from Cambridge. He took first class honors in Part I of the Historical Tripos and a "starred" first in Part II. Upon graduating he was awarded the Earl of Derby Research Scholarship. He was invited to stay on as a graduate student at Trinity College, but it was the summer when Francisco Franco led the Nationalist rebellion against Spain's left-wing government. Cornford turned Cambridge down and went to Barcelona in August 1936 to join the anti-Stalinist "Workers' Party of Marxist Unification" (POUM) militia that was fighting against Franco's forces. He served briefly on the Aragon front where he wrote his three best-known poems, among them the often-anthologized "To Margot Heinemann" (originally titled simply "Poem"). In September he returned to England to recruit more volunteers, including Bernard Knox, John Sommerfield, Chris Thorneycroft, and Griffin MacLaurin. With this group he travelled to Paris and then to Albacete, where they joined the International Brigades—the nucleus of what would become the British Battalion.

Cornford served with a machine-gun unit of the Commune de Paris Battalion, and fought alongside a number of other British volunteers, including Esmond Romilly, in the defence of Madrid in late 1936. During the Battle of Ciudad Universitaria he was wounded in the head by shrapnel, but he refused to rest and after a brief visit to a hospital, returned to the front. In the Battle of Boadilla del Monte in December 1936, his unit for the first time faced massed German troops (who were bolstering Franco's side) and under heavy bombardment had to retreat twelve kilometres in twenty-four hours. Here, as the unit commander chosen by his men, Cornford (in the words of an English correspondent) "acquitted himself magnificently", saving many lives.

Shortly after transferring to the newly formed British Battalion, he was killed in uncertain circumstances at Lopera, near Córdoba, the day after his 21st birthday. Confirmation of his death reached England one month later.

== Legacy ==
In February 1937, donations were publicly solicited for the Cornford-MacLaurin Memorial Fund (Griffith MacLaurin was another ex-Cambridge student killed in Spain in late 1936). The money raised went to the International Brigades and to British organizations aiding the Spanish Republican cause.

A memorial volume dedicated to Cornford was published in 1938. Stephen Spender observed in his review of the book, "Cornford's life speaks for itself in a way that burns the imagination ... The fact that Cornford lived and that others like him still live, is an important lesson to the leaders of democracies. It shows that people will live and die and fight for democracy if it gives them the justice and freedom which are worth fighting for." In a 1942 essay, Hugh MacDiarmid labeled Cornford and Christopher Caudwell the "few inspiring exceptions" among "the leftist poets of the comfortable classes".

Julian Mitchell, in his award-winning 1981 play Another Country, used Cornford as a model for the Marxist poet character "Tommy Judd".

== Critical assessment ==
In a 1940 essay, "My Country Right or Left", George Orwell draws a connection between Cornford's "Full Moon at Tierz: Before the Storming of Huesca" and a patriotic English poem by Henry Newbolt:

Let anyone compare the poem John Cornford wrote not long before he was killed ("Before the Storming of Huesca") with Sir Henry Newbolt's "There's a breathless hush in the close tonight". Put aside the technical differences, which are merely a matter of period, and it will be seen that the emotional content of the two poems is almost exactly the same. The young Communist who died heroically in the International Brigade was public school to the core. He had changed his allegiance but not his emotions.

Orwell argues that the same selfless commitment to duty in service of one's school, country and king (as expressed in Newbolt's poem) can also be enlisted for the cause of building socialism, that it's a different allegiance but is based on the same underlying emotion.

Professor Stan Smith, in a 2008 Journal of English Studies article, provides a detailed reading of "Full Moon at Tierz". He suggests that the poem is not unequivocally pro-Communist but instead "discloses a more complicated, less doctrinaire reality" than typically associated with Cornford. In the first section's reference to the "Crooked...road that we must tread", Smith sees an element of doubt creeping into the poet's consciousness. The doubt becomes more explicit in the second section when the poet conveys his thoughts while on sentry duty on a moonlit night:

All round the barren hills of Aragon
Announce our testing has begun.
Here what the Seventh Congress said,
If true, if false, is live or dead,
Speaks in the Oviedo Mauser's tone.

Smith writes, "The 'testing' announced by the full moon rising over friend and foe alike on the bare hills of Aragon is not only a test of physical courage in the fight with an external and ubiquitous fascism. It refers also to an internal moral struggle with one's bourgeois self, to maintain loyalty to the Party amidst misgivings about its policies and practice."

In the third section, the poet confronts his own isolation. Smith points to the line, "Now, with my Party, I stand quite alone", how in the war's "enforced solidarity, it is the loneliness which persists":

Then let my private battle with my nerves,
The fear of pain whose pain survives,
The love that tears me by the roots,
The loneliness that claws my guts,
Fuse in the welded front our fight preserves.

In Smith's interpretation, "A hesitant and solitary being wills himself, in a kind of prayer to an absent Marxian deity, not to lose his faith, to be a good Communist":

Cornford's best-known poem, posthumously titled "To Margot Heinemann", partakes of the same emotional directness, but in a more tender vein. British poet Carol Rumens describes it as "one of the most moving and memorable 20th-century love poems". While the form is in some respects traditional—ballad-form quatrains with rhyme scheme ABCB—its rhythms are irregular, with two to three stresses per line, and its rhymes often slant like in the last stanza: "And if bad luck should lay my strength / Into the shallow grave, / Remember all the good you can; / Don't forget my love." Rumens says: "You feel as if you have been presented with a photograph of a young soldier's inner life. He is a passionate lover and a passionate warrior: these qualities are held in perfect psychic balance. And they are timeless. The speaker could be one of Homer's heroes. He could be a Spartan at Thermopylae." The famous opening lines, "Heart of the heartless world, / Dear heart, the thought of you", actually contain a blind quotation from Marx, who in the Introduction to his Critique of Hegel's Philosophy of Right characterizes religion as "the heart of a heartless world."

== James Cornford ==
John's son, James (1935–2011), who was not yet two years old when his father was killed in action, became an academic and social reformer. Educated at Winchester College and Trinity College, Cambridge, he earned a first-class degree in history and a Harkness Fellowship, and was made a fellow of his college at age 25. In 1964 he was named a lecturer in Politics at the University of Edinburgh, and four years later was appointed the university's Professor of Politics, succeeding Harold Hanham.

Cornford's rapid promotions were controversial, given his lack of a doctorate, his slender record of publications (one book chapter and a journal article), and his family's close acquaintance with the university's vice-chancellor, Michael Swann. Resigning in 1976 to join the Outer Circle Policy Unit (a creation of the Joseph Rowntree Reform Trust), Cornford led a variety of organizations, such as the Nuffield Foundation, the Campaign for Freedom of Information (1984–1997), the Paul Hamlyn Foundation, and the Institute for Public Policy Research. He became the literary editor and later chairman of The Political Quarterly journal. He was an advisor to David Clark after the Labour Party was returned to government in 1997, but when Clark's advocacy for a strong freedom of information law was rejected by Cabinet, both men resigned. James Cornford died in 2011.

== Works ==
- Cornford, John (1958). Gilenson, Boris Aleksandrovich (ed.). Communism Was My Waking Time. Moscow: Foreign Languages Publishing House. OCLC 926697685.
- Galassi, Jonathan, ed. (1976). Understand the Weapon, Understand the Wound: Selected Writings of John Cornford. Manchester UK: Carcanet New Press. ISBN 978-0856351525.
