= Derek Brown (editor) =

British food writer

- Occupation: Food writer, editor
- Period: 1974–present
- Genre: Restaurant guide
- Subject: Gastronomy, haute cuisine
- Years active: 1974–present
- Notable works: Michelin Guide

Derek Brown (born 1944 or 1945) is a British food writer and was editor of the Michelin Red Guides; the first non-French person to do so.

Brown attended a hotel school then worked hotel front desks and in restaurants, then became a Michelin Guide reviewer in his early 30s.

He appeared as a castaway on the BBC Radio programme Desert Island Discs on 25 May 2003.
