= University of Michigan student housing =

Housing system of the University of Michigan

Coordinates: 42°16′35.7″N 83°44′33.2″W

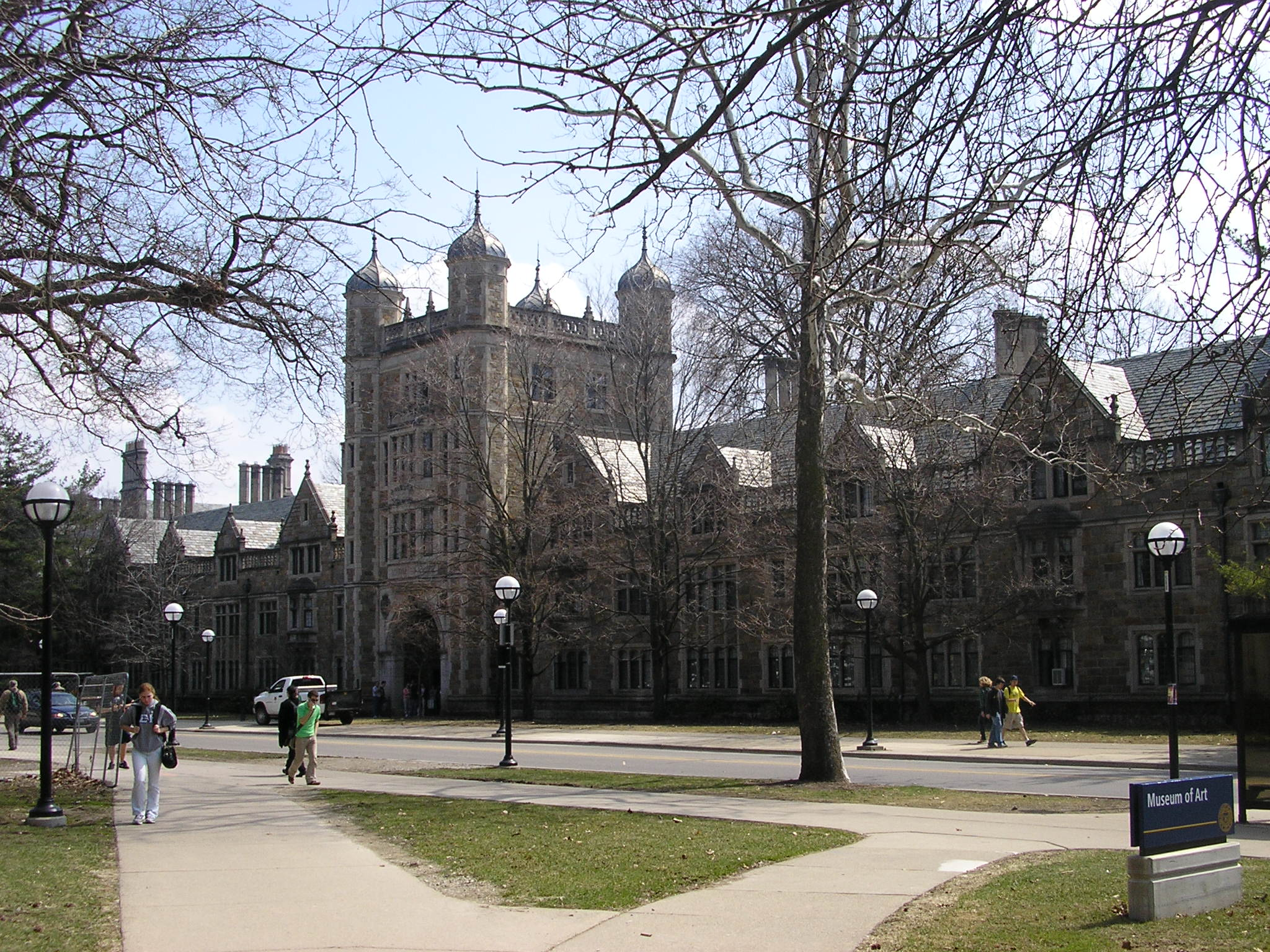
Lawyers Club and Munger Residences

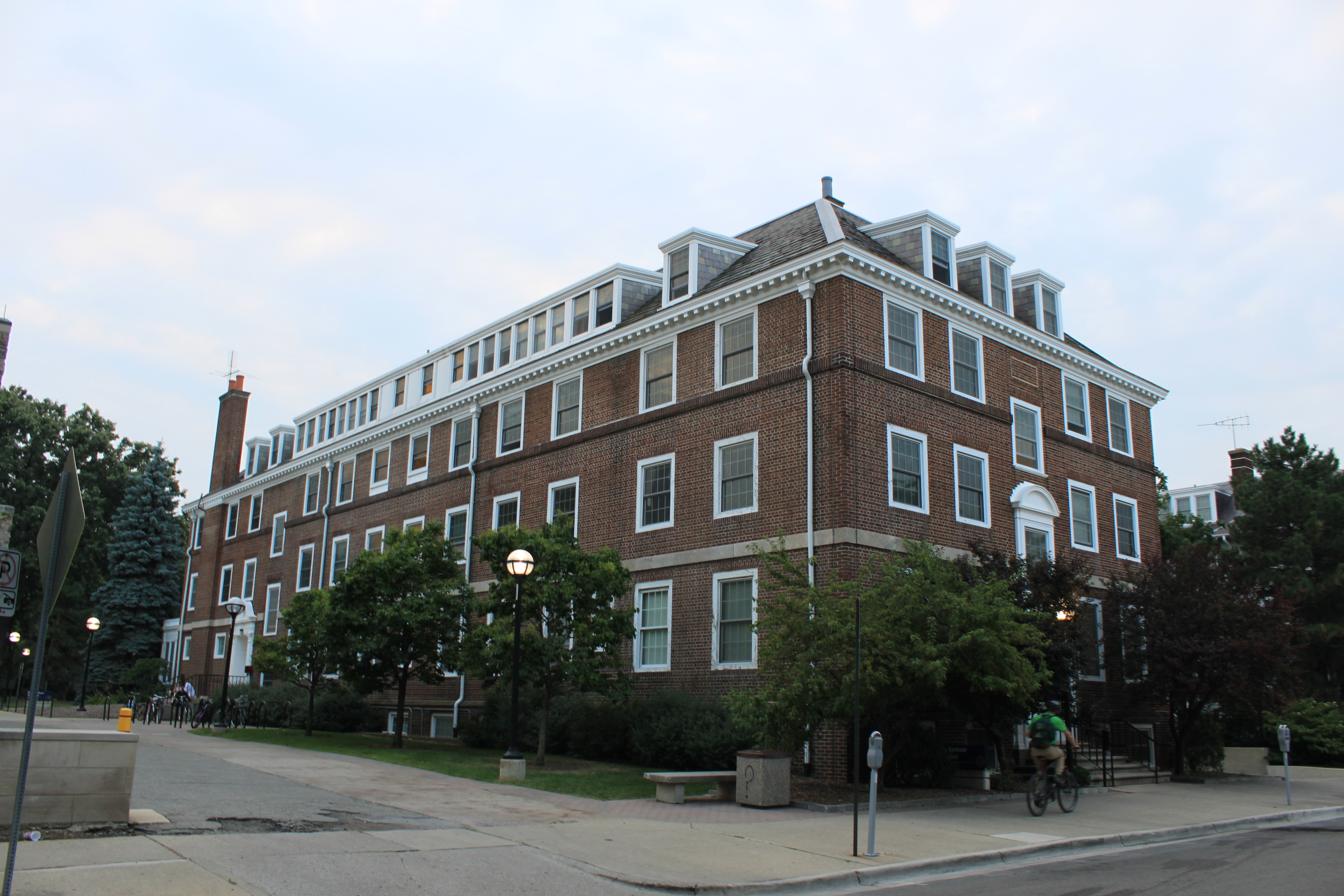
Betsy Barbour House

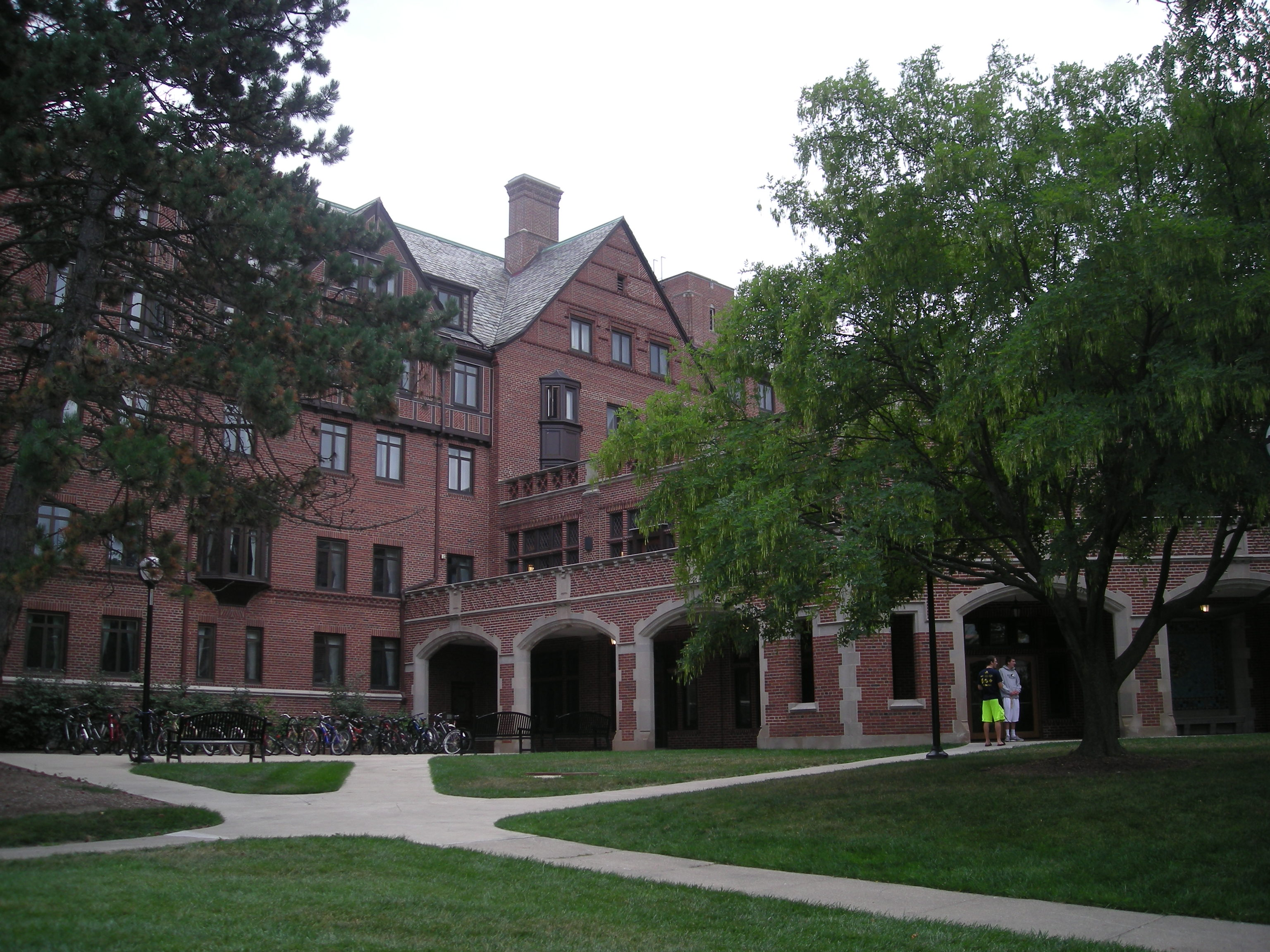
Stockwell Hall

The campus housing system at the University of Michigan in Ann Arbor, referred to as University Housing (which is a unit of Student Life), provides living accommodations for approximately 10,000 undergraduate and graduate students. There is no requirement for first-year students to live in University Housing, yet approximately 97% of incoming students choose to do so. Every year, over 9,500 undergraduate students are housed in 18 residence halls on Central Campus, the Hill Neighborhood, and North Campus. Undergraduates, graduate students, and students with families can live in University Housing apartments in the Northwood Community on North Campus. Seven full-service dining halls as well as several retail shops provide students with daily dining options.

== Recent developments ==
South Quadrangle reopened for the fall 2014 term after extensive renovations. The renovated South Quad features an all-new dining facility equipped with 10 unique restaurant concepts, music practice rooms, a new community center, redesigned group study rooms, improved student bathrooms, wireless network access, upgraded plumbing, and air conditioning.

West Quadrangle was closed for renovations from the end of the winter 2014 term and reopened in 2015. The new design includes upgraded infrastructure, improved accessibility, renovated student rooms and bathrooms, and remodeled community and study spaces. The dining operation in West Quad did not reopen — accommodated by the new dining center in South Quad across the street — and the previous dining and kitchen areas were repurposed as community spaces.

Construction was completed in the summer of 2015 for the Munger Graduate Residences, a new residence hall for graduate students. In April 2013, University Housing announced a $110 million gift from U-M alumnus Charles Munger; $100 million was dedicated to the new facility and $10 million was dedicated to fellowship funding. With a focus on collaborative living for scholars, the design includes study spaces, meeting rooms, music practice spaces, a multi-purpose room, and a recreation room.

After a year-long renovation, East Quadrangle reopened for the fall 2013 term with improved infrastructure, renovated student rooms and bathrooms, an improved dining hall and kitchen facilities, new spaces to enhance student and community life, and renovated classrooms and faculty offices.

Other completed projects include renovations to Alice Lloyd Hall and a remodel of Baits Houses (named for Regent Vera Baits), both of which reopened in fall 2012. Couzens Hall reopened for the fall 2011 semester after extensive renovation. The newest residence hall, North Quadrangle, was opened in fall 2010. Features of North Quad include modern student rooms, a marketplace-style dining center, community learning spaces, a high-tech media gateway, classrooms and seminar spaces, and lounges on each floor. Stockwell Hall reopened in 2009 after renovation. In 2008, construction of the Hill Dining Center was completed. The two-level dining center offers a variety of meal options as well as Victors cafe, which offers longer hours and convenience items. Connected to the Hill Dining Center is Mosher-Jordan Hall, which reopened in 2008 after renovation.

=== Residential life initiatives ===
The University of Michigan’s Residential Life Initiatives was launched in 2004 in order to improve residential and dining facilities and strengthen the relationship between living and learning. The university has invested in several major projects to revitalize residential facilities, programs, and dining. These projects include the building, renovation, and remodeling of residence halls and dining facilities, the renewal of community spaces, as well as upgraded internet access and electrical, heating, plumbing, ventilation, and fire detection and alarm systems. Fire suppression (sprinkler) systems have been installed in all residence halls.

University Housing’s building portfolio and inventory totals approximately 4.7 million square feet of floor space, which is around one sixth of the campus total. University Housing is an auxiliary enterprise and is financially self-supporting for annual operations by its room and board revenue. It seeks to balance room and board rates with the mission of providing students with a satisfactory experience that supports their academic progress, and reinvesting in facilities so they meet the needs of current and future generations of students.

== Graduate and family housing ==
Over 1,000 graduate students, student families, and post-doctoral research fellows reside in apartments and townhouses of the Northwood Community. Proximity to nearby restaurants, shopping areas, and local schools appeal to Northwood Community residents. Representing more than 80 countries, residents have the opportunity to learn about customs and lifestyles from around the world. Northwood community staff host a wide range of cultural and social events that engage students and families.

== Dining ==
Michigan Dining offers a variety of meal plan options. Students may go to one of the seven full-service dining halls located across campus for an all-you-care-to-eat meal. They also have the option to purchase food from several retail locations and in-hall cafes, many of which feature early-morning and late-night hours.

In order to serve a diverse range of needs and appetites, menus may feature vegan, vegetarian, halal, and gluten-free options. Michigan Dining also offers meal accommodations for religious observance. Many foods are made with locally produced ingredients as part of the initiative to achieve green and sustainable dining practices. Nutrition and allergy information are provided online by Michigan Dining staff, as well as guidance and support including the MHealthy Dining Program. Generally, between 30 and 40 percent of food offerings a day are labeled as MHealthy and upwards of 40 percent are labeled vegan. A team of dieticians offers free individual consultations, allergy and special diet support, nutrition publications, and healthy eating seminars. Popular with students, special meal events are hosted throughout the year.

== Community ==
Resident Advisors are live-in staff members who provide immediate support for students. Resident advisors welcome new students into the housing environment, answer students’ questions, facilitate social activities, and assist residents in their individual experiences within the communities.

Academic support is provided by a Peer Academic Success Specialist (PASS). The PASS provides students with guidance on course and concentration selection, study skills, and technology assistance. PASSes hold regular advising hours and offer various workshops throughout the school year.

Community Learning Centers in residence halls offer a technology-rich, comfortable learning space for individual and group work. Other technology support includes residential computing sites, high-speed internet access in student rooms, Help Desk service, and digital learning skills.

The residence hall student government consists of the Residence Halls Association, hall councils, and multicultural councils. The Residence Halls Association (RHA), the student residence hall association, works with University Housing to enhance community life, sponsoring events and programs for residents throughout the year. The RHA is affiliated with the Great Lakes Affiliate of College and University Residence Halls (GLACURH). Hall councils focus on hall programming and informing professional staff of students’ concerns. Representatives act as liaisons between the RHA and their respective hall councils. Multicultural councils provide students with diversity education and cultural awareness. Advised by Diversity Peer Educators, multicultural councils host service learning projects and other community-wide events.

Additionally, several residential Michigan Learning Communities allow students with similar interests to live and study together. Each program is associated with a University of Michigan academic department. These include programs such as the Global Scholars Program, the Honors Program, Living Arts, the Michigan Community Scholars Program, the Women in Science and Engineering Residence Program, and more.

=== Safety and security ===
Unique to Big Ten universities, U-M has a security unit dedicated to campus housing. Housing Security and Safety officers regularly patrol residence halls and apartments. Officers are available to assist residents, investigate incidents, and monitor electronic access and fire protection systems. They also meet with individuals and groups about campus safety.

== Student employment ==
More than 2,000 students are employed annually by University Housing through a variety of temporary, part-time, and Work-Study positions. Despite this, most of those, including Resident Advisors, Summer Conference Assistants, and Diversity Peer Educators, are not considered employees by the university. Instead, they are compensated for their work through "scholarships." As a result, student staff members do not have access to official grievance processes regarding their employment at the university.

== Campus neighborhoods ==
Central Campus

- Betsy Barbour (opened 1920)
- East Quadrangle (opened 1941)
  - Henry Clay Anderson House (opened in 1947)
  - Charles Horton Cooley House (opened in 1947)
  - Charles Ezra Greene House (opened in 1940)
  - Joseph Ralston Hayden House (opened in 1947)
  - Burke Aaron Hinsdale House (opened in 1940)
  - Albert Benjamin Prescott House (opened in 1940)
  - Louis Abraham Strauss House (opened in 1947)
  - Moses Coit Tyler House (opened in 1940)
- Frank W. Fletcher Hall (opened 1922)
- Helen Newberry (opened in 1915)
- Mary Barton Henderson House (opened 1945)
- Lawyers Club (opened 1924)
- Martha Cook Building (opened in 1915)
- North Quadrangle (opened in 2010)
- South Quadrangle (opened in 1951)
  - Margaret Salisbury Bush House
  - Frederick House
  - Moses Gomberg House
  - G. Carl Huber House
  - Nora Crane Hunt House
  - Francis W. Kelsey House
  - Fred Manville Taylor House
  - Betty Vaughan Thronson House
- West Quadrangle (opened in 1940)
  - Henry Carter Adams House (opened in 1939)
  - John Allen - Elisha Rumsey House (opened in 1937)
  - Chicago House (opened in 1939; named for the Chicago Chapter of the UM Alumni Association)
  - Alfred Henry Lloyd House (opened in 1939)
  - Michigan House (opened in 1939; named for the State of Michigan)
  - Robert Mark Wenley House (opened in 1939)
  - George Palmer Williams (opened in 1939)
  - Alexander Winchell House (opened in 1939)
  - Cambridge House (opened 1937)
- Munger Graduate Residences (opened in 2015)

The Hill

- Alice Crocker Lloyd Hall (opened in 1949)
  - Sarah Caswell Angell House
  - Mary Louisa Hinsdale House
  - Caroline Hubbard Kleinseuck House
  - Alice Freeman Palmer House
- Couzens Hall (opened in 1925)
- Mary Markley Hall (opened in 1958)
  - Charlotte Alice Blagdon House
  - Orma Fitch Butler House
  - Lucy Elvira Elliott House
  - Josephine Rankin Fisher House
  - Robert Frost House
  - Barbara Jane Little House
  - Jeese Reeves House
  - Frederick Scott House
  - Claude Van Tyne House
  - Arati Sharangpani Lounge (dedicated in 1998)
  - Roy Akers Scholarship (founded in 1984)
- Mosher-Jordan Halls(opened in 1930)
  - Eliza M. Mosher Hall
  - Myra B. Jordan Hall
- Oxford Housing (opened in 1963)
  - Adelia Cheever House
  - Julia Esther Emanuel House
  - Geddes House
  - Lillian Emma Goddard House
  - Mary Alice Goddard House
  - Pamela Noble House
  - Laurel Harper Seeley House
  - Hazel (Whittaker) Vanderberg House
  - Arthur Vanderberg House
- Stockwell Hall (opened in 1940)

North Campus

- Baits Houses (opened 1966)
  - John Wallace Eaton House
  - Alfred Oughton Lee House
  - DeWitt Henry Parker House
  - Sara Spencer Brown Smith House
  - Albert Augustus Stanley House
- Vera Burridge Baits Houses (opened in 1967)
  - Katherine Ellis Coman House
  - Lucile Bailey Conger House
  - Arthur Lyon Cross House
  - Hugo Paul Thieme House
  - Alexander Ziwet House
- Joseph A. and Marguerite K. Bursley Hall (opened in 1968)
  - Silas Hamilton Douglas House
  - Alice Hamilton House
  - Harley Harris Bartlett House
  - Howard B. Lewis House
  - Barbara Rotvig House
  - Amanda Sanford (Hickey) House
  - Arthur J. Van Duren Jr. House
  - Bertha Van Hoosen House
- Northwood apartments

== Additional information ==
University Housing offers gender-inclusive housing options, including the Gender Inclusive Living Experience, for residents of all gender identities and expressions. Accommodations are also provided for students with disabilities, students with chronic health conditions, students in recovery, students with food allergens, and for religious observance.

== Gallery ==
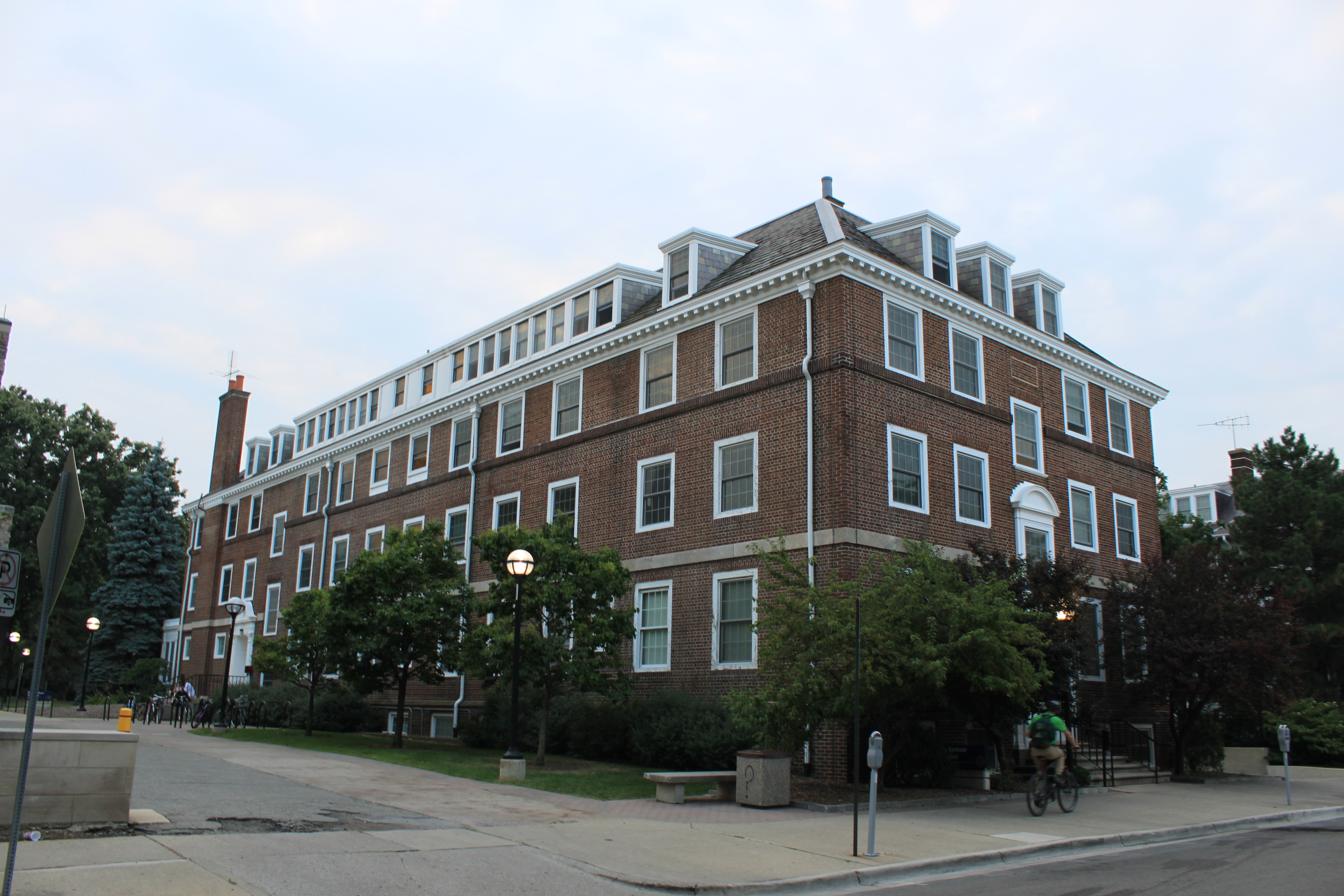
Betsy Barbour House

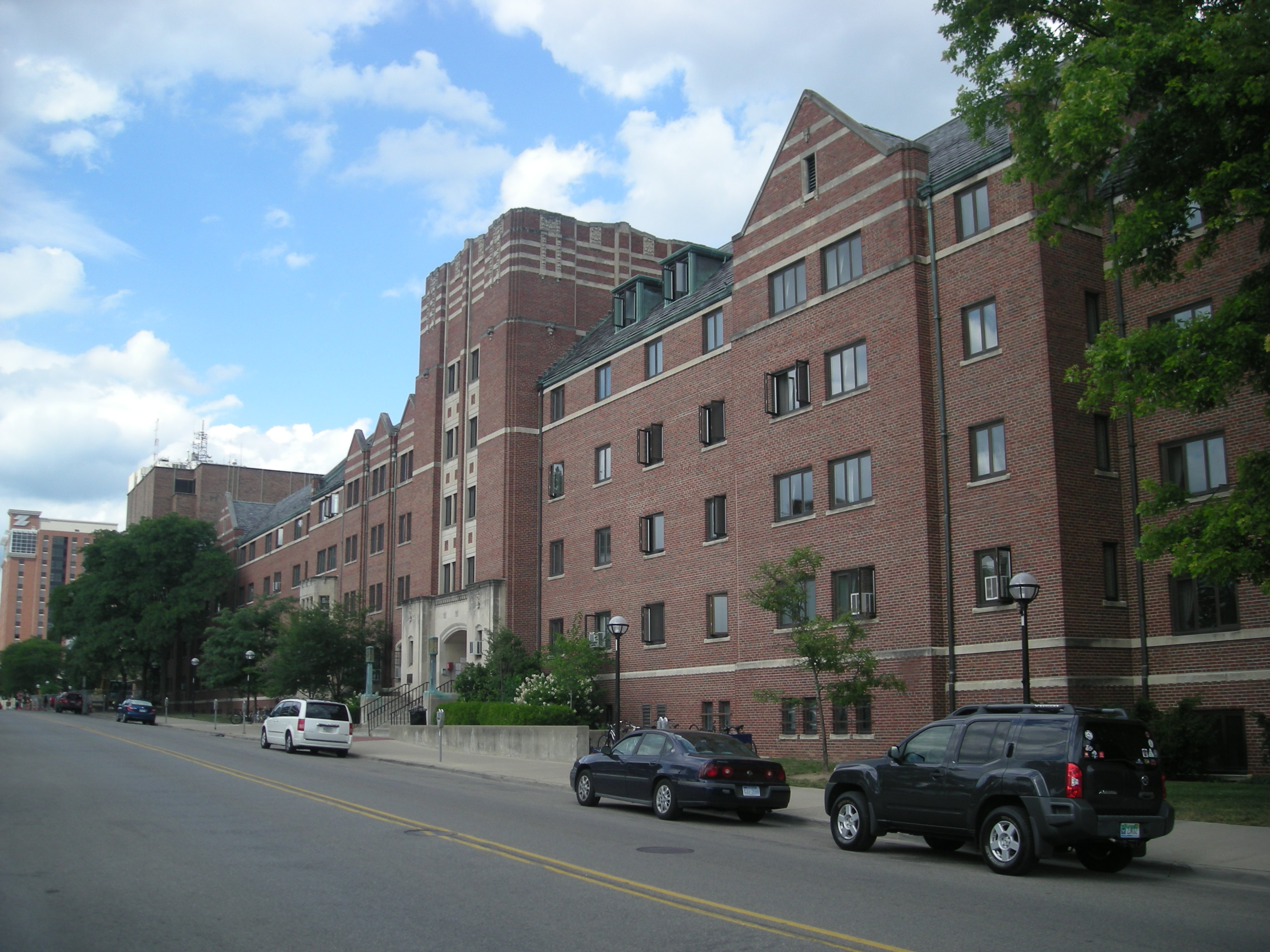
West Quadrangle

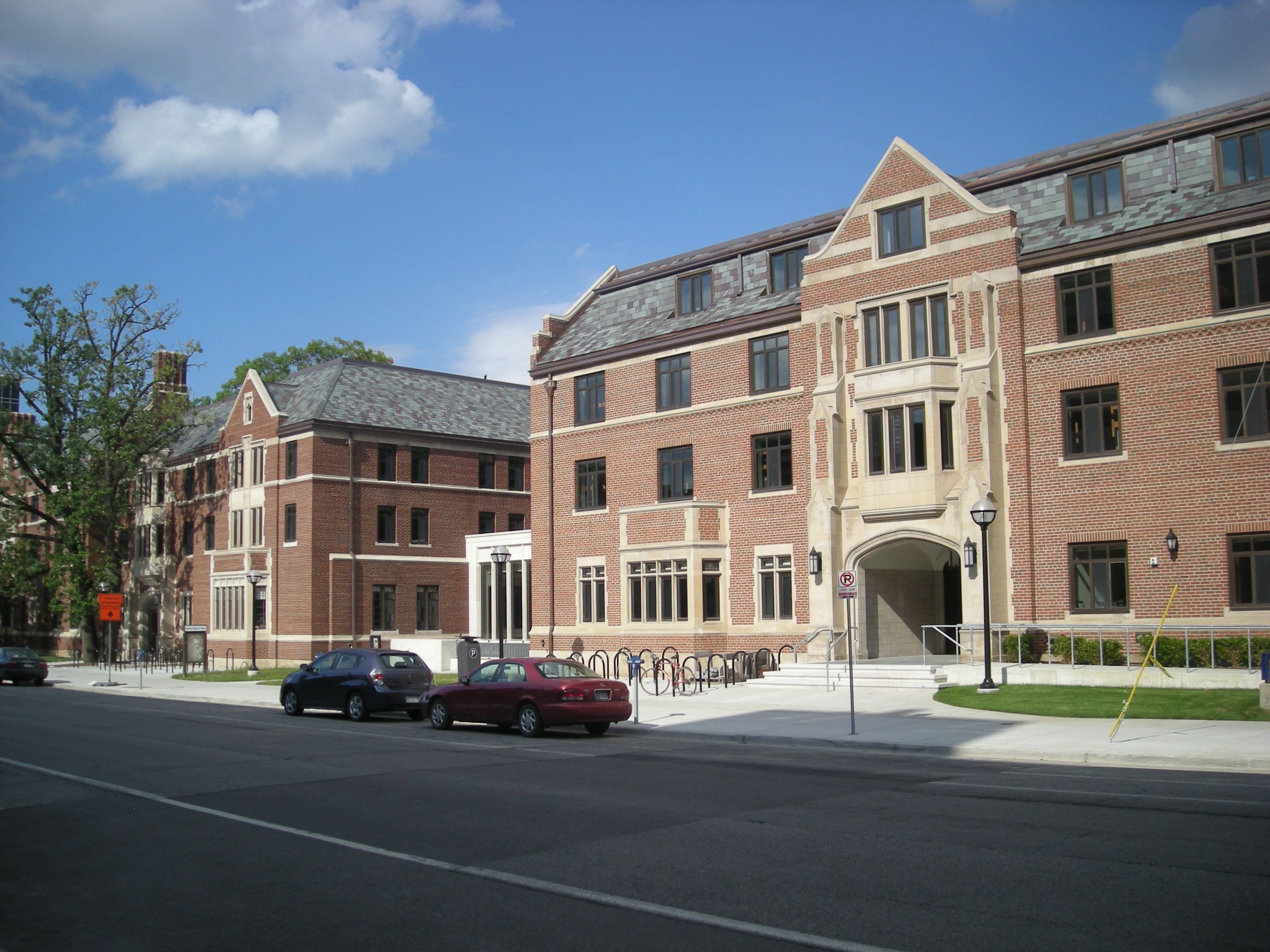
East Quadrangle

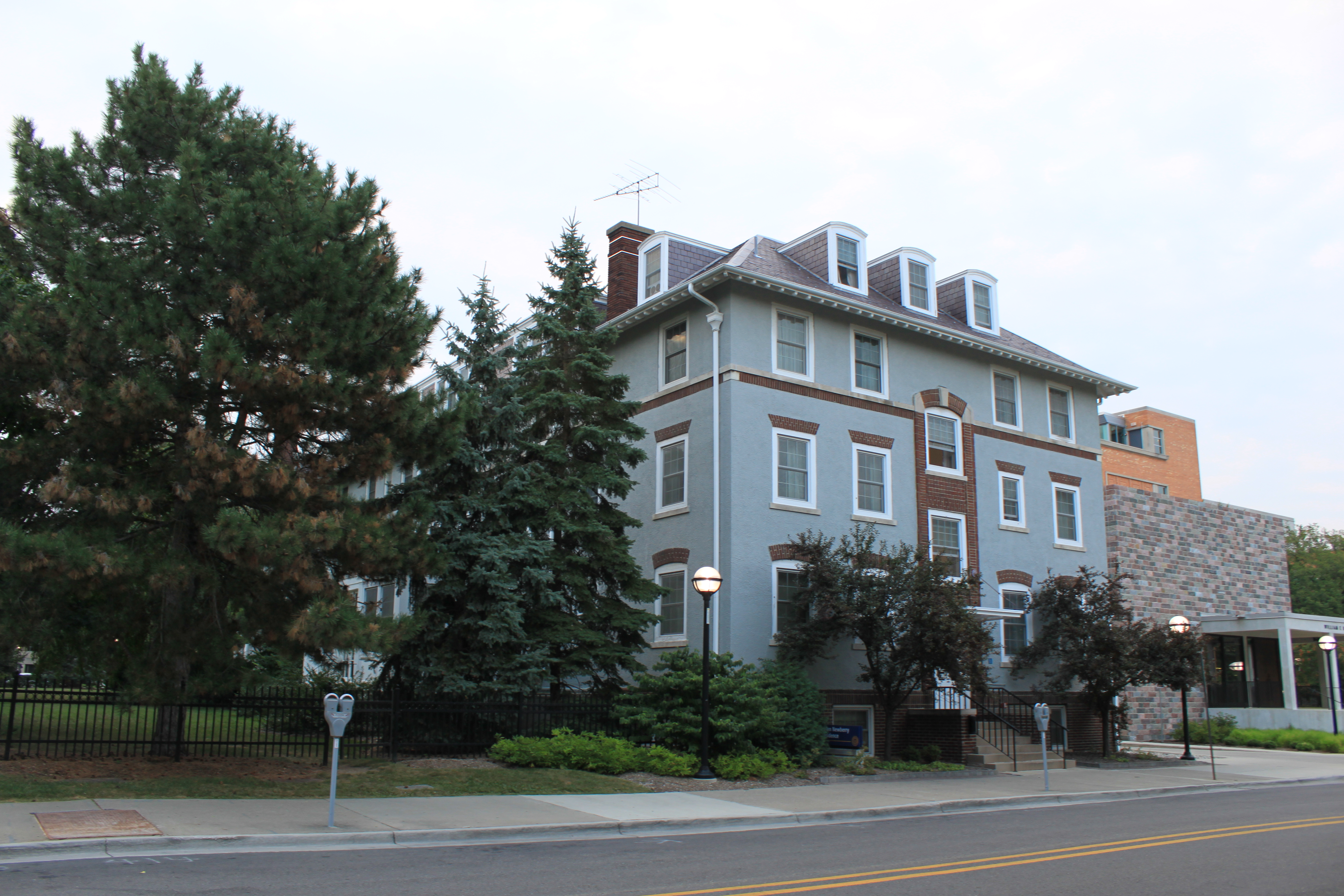
Helen Newberry House

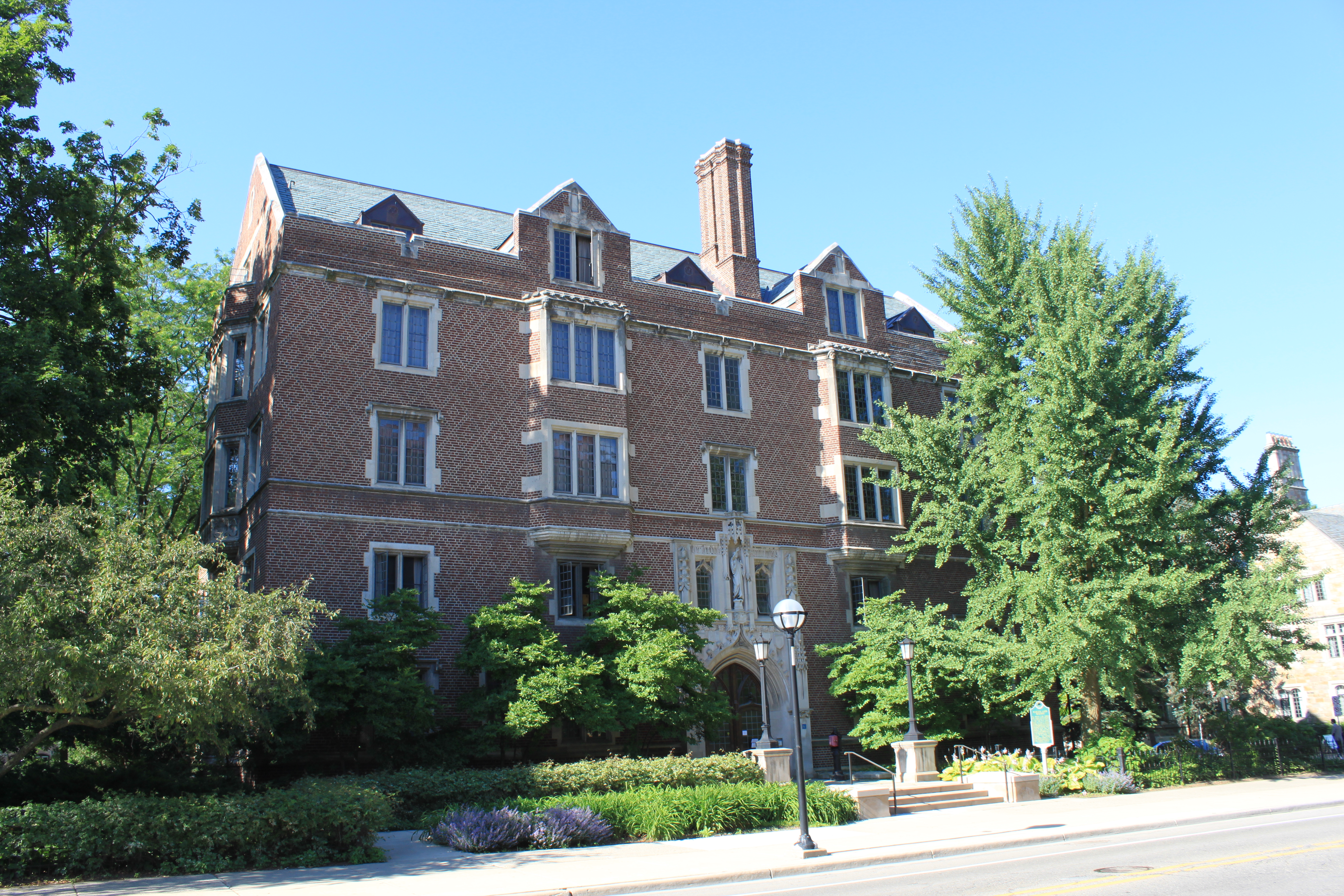
Martha Cook Building

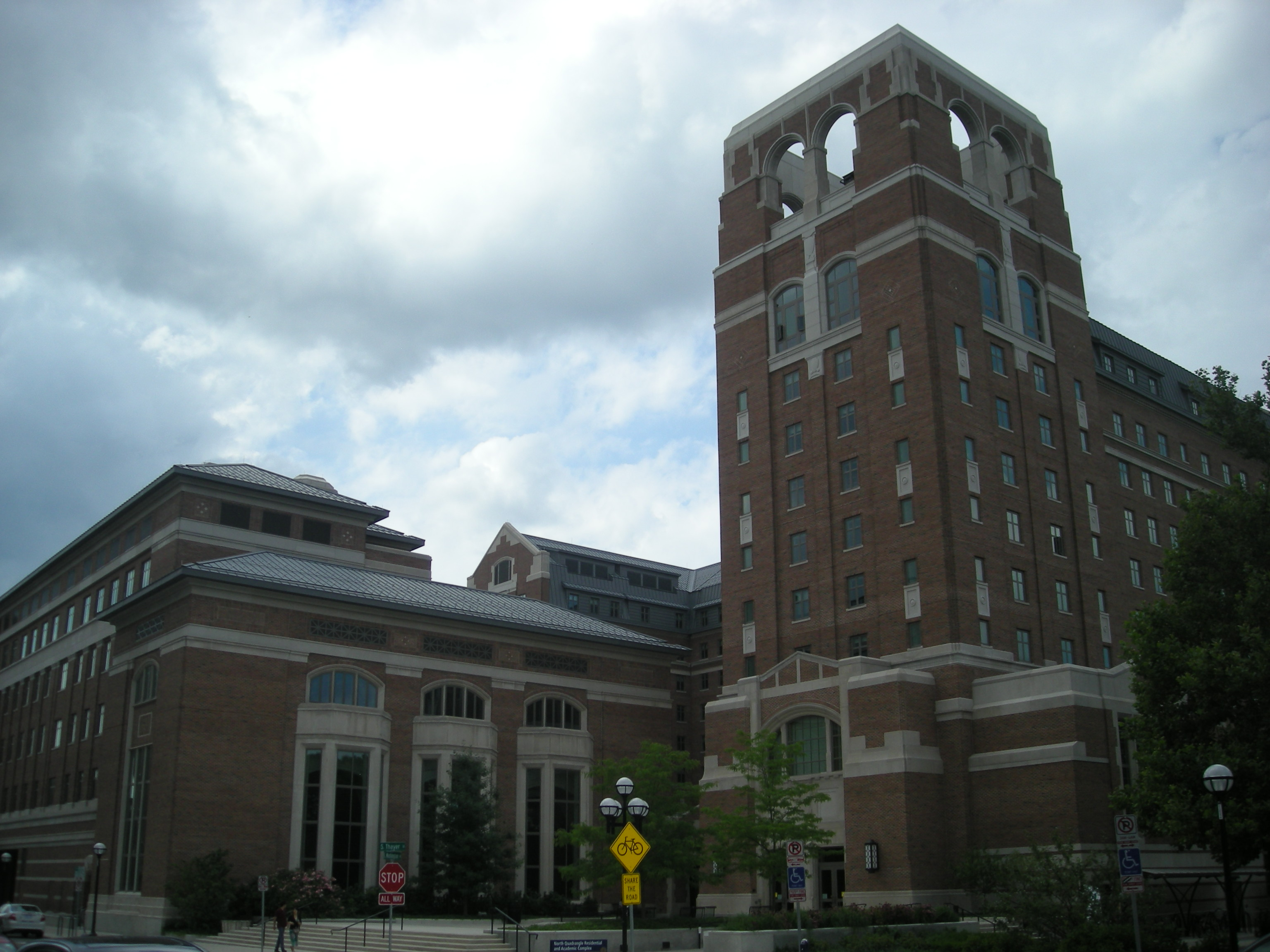
North Quadrangle

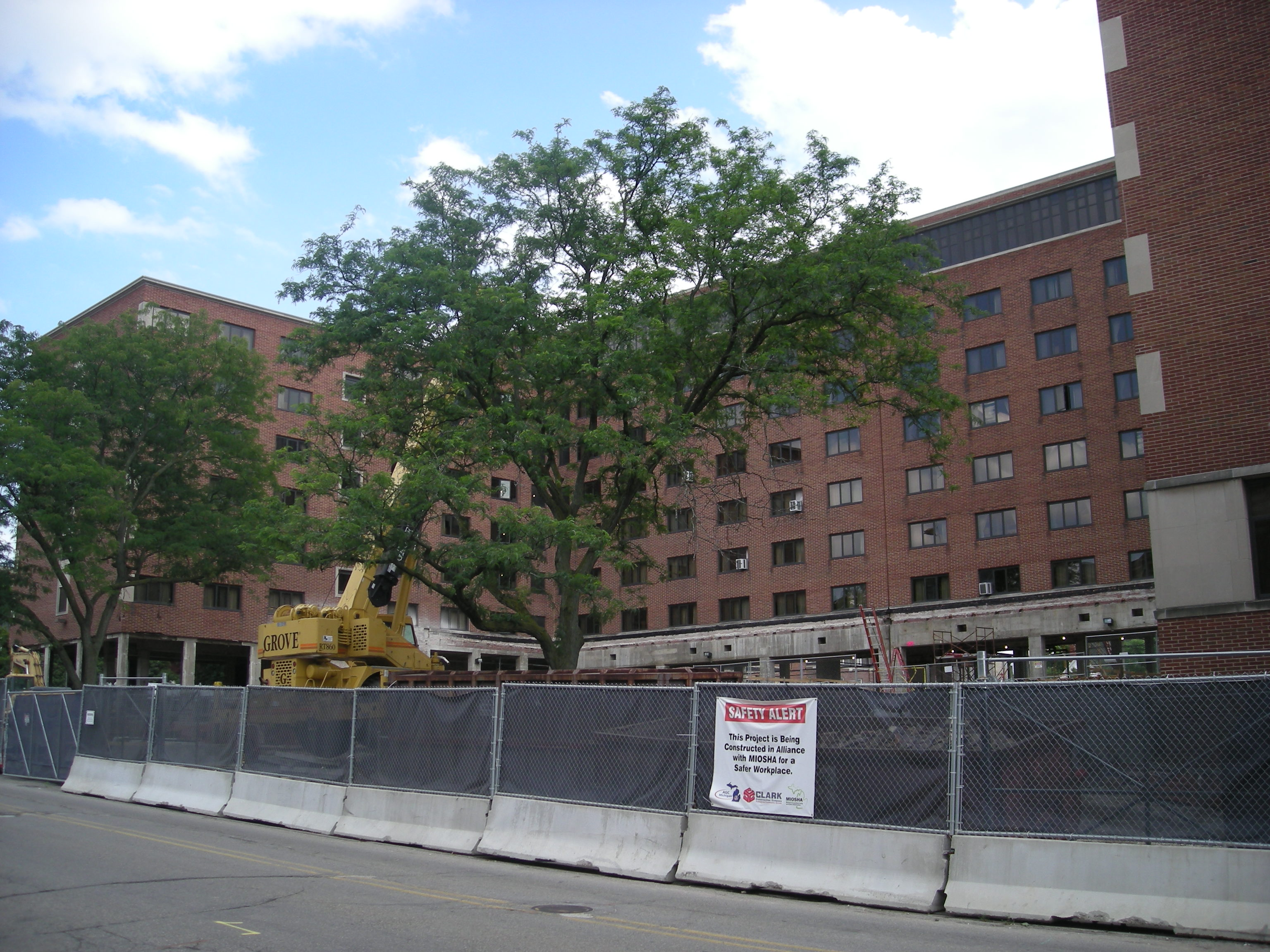
South Quadrangle

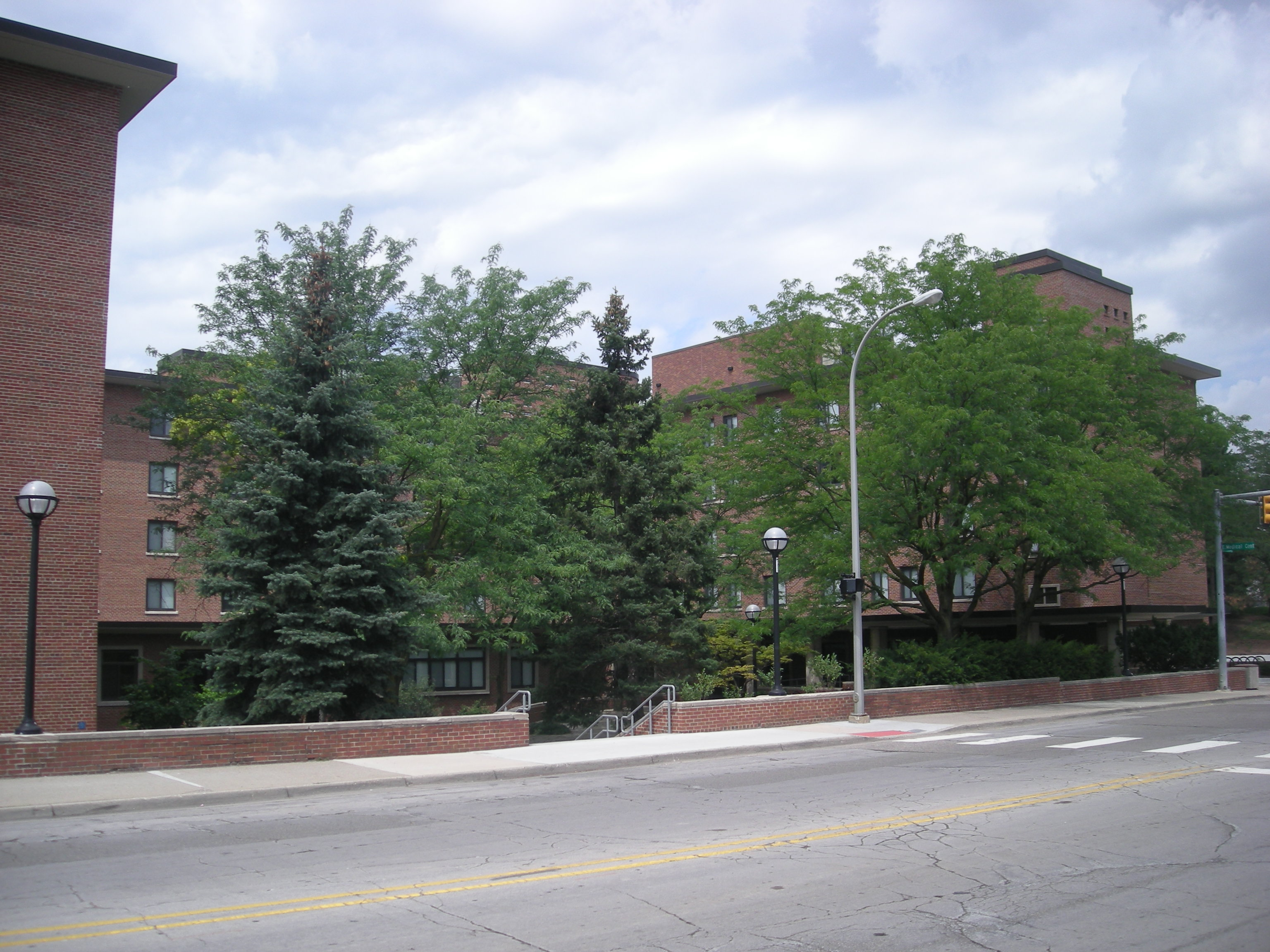
Alice Lloyd Hall

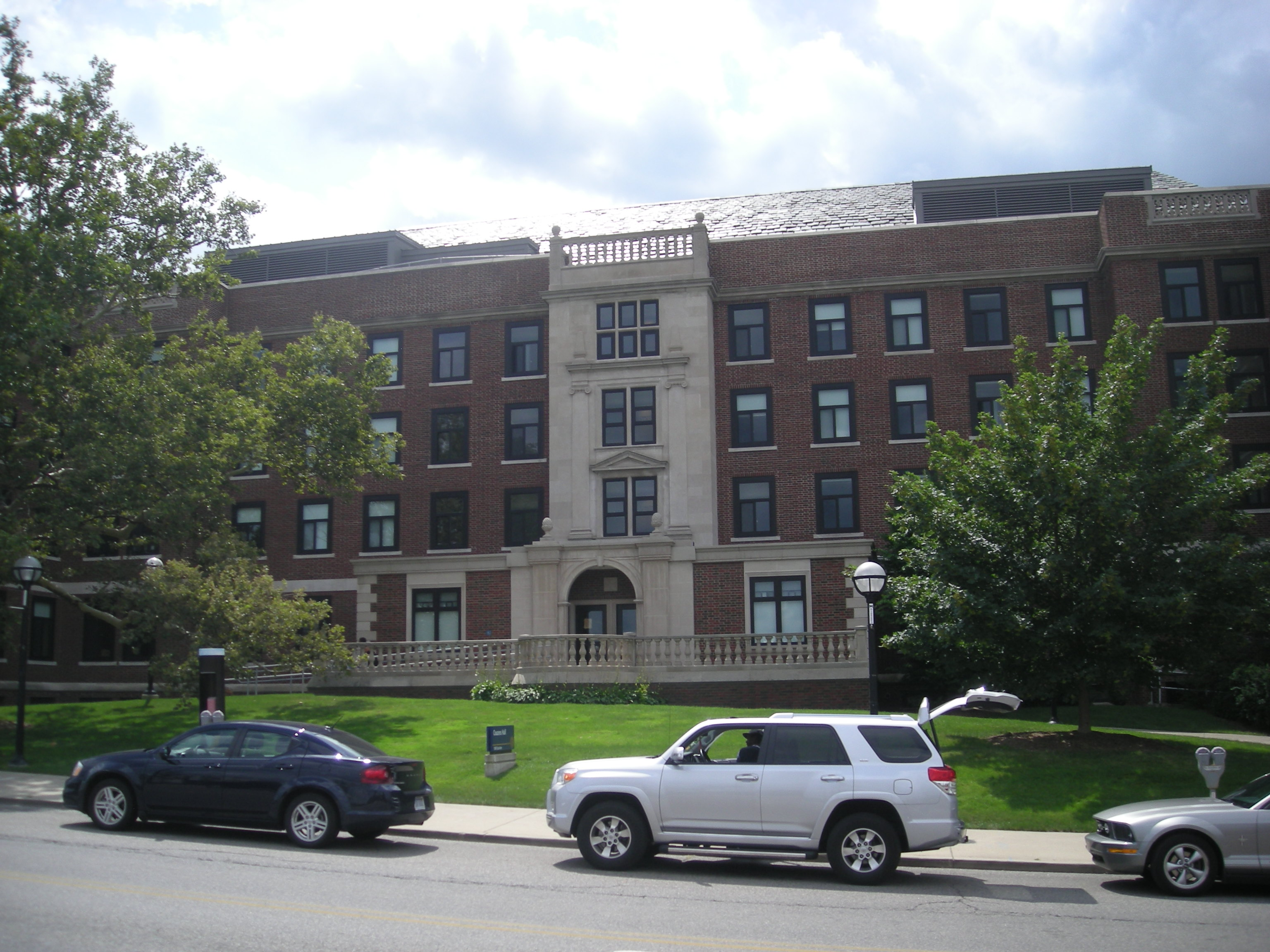
Couzens Hall

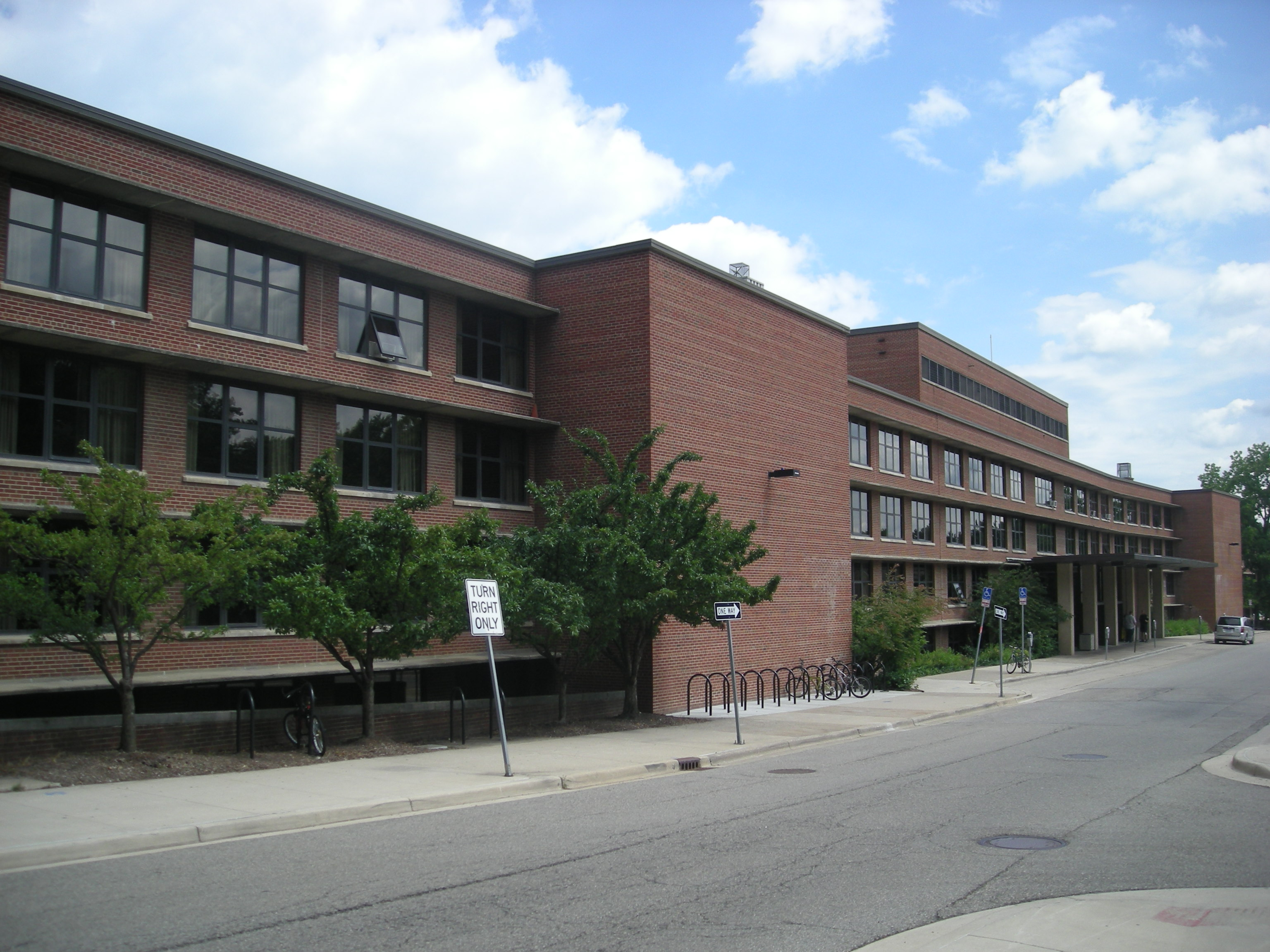
Mary Markley Hall

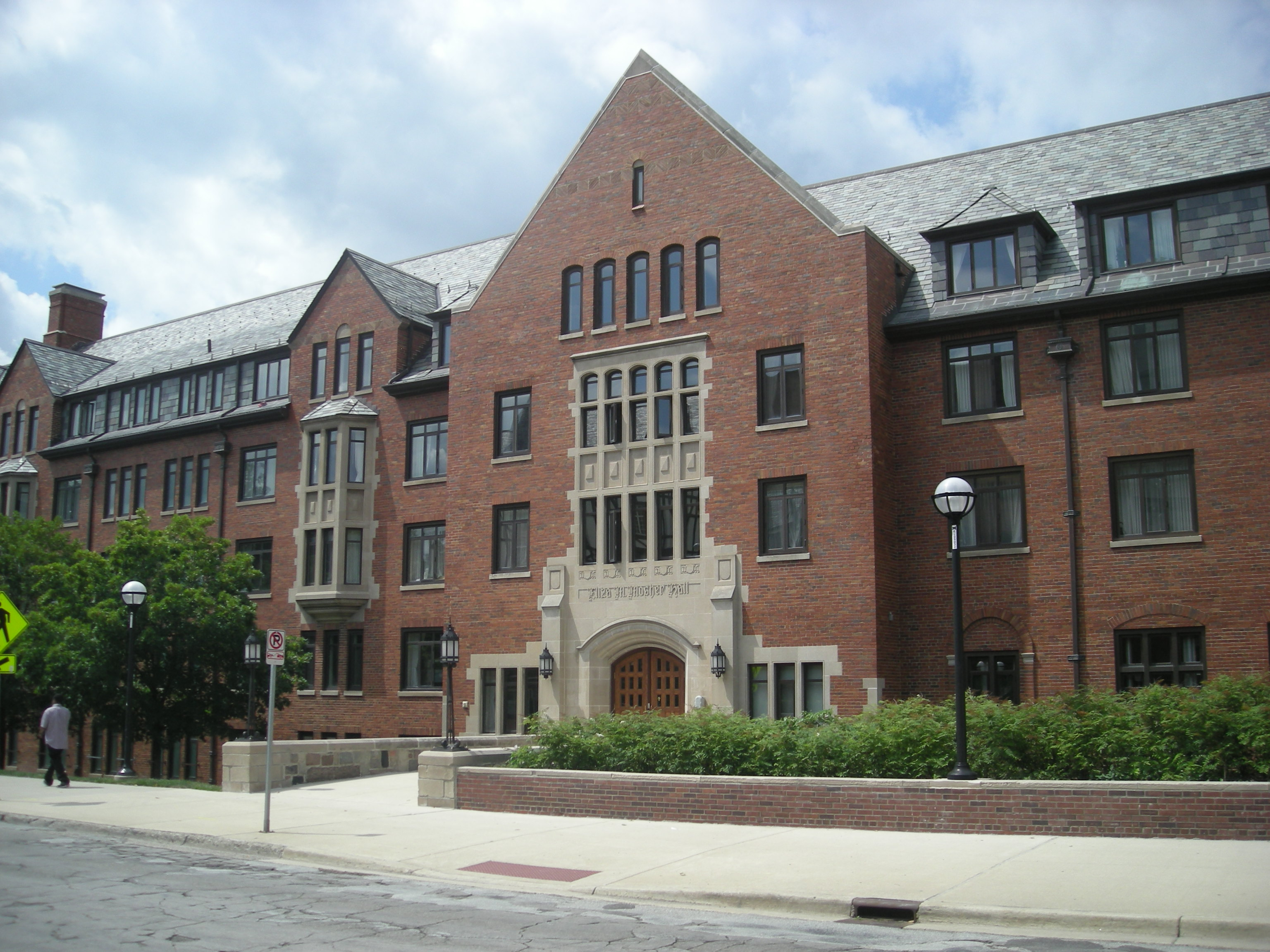
Mosher-Jordan Halls

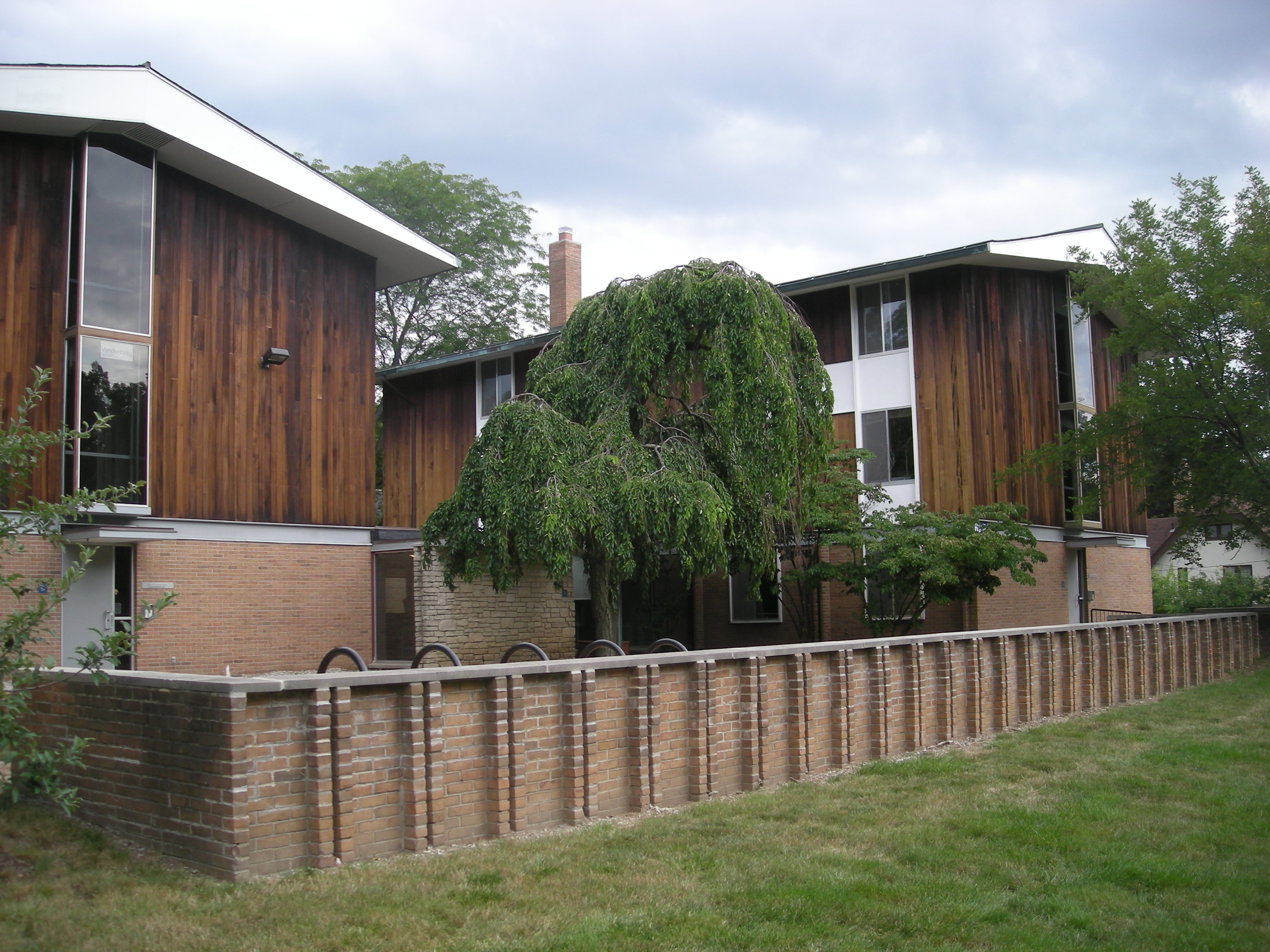
Oxford Housing

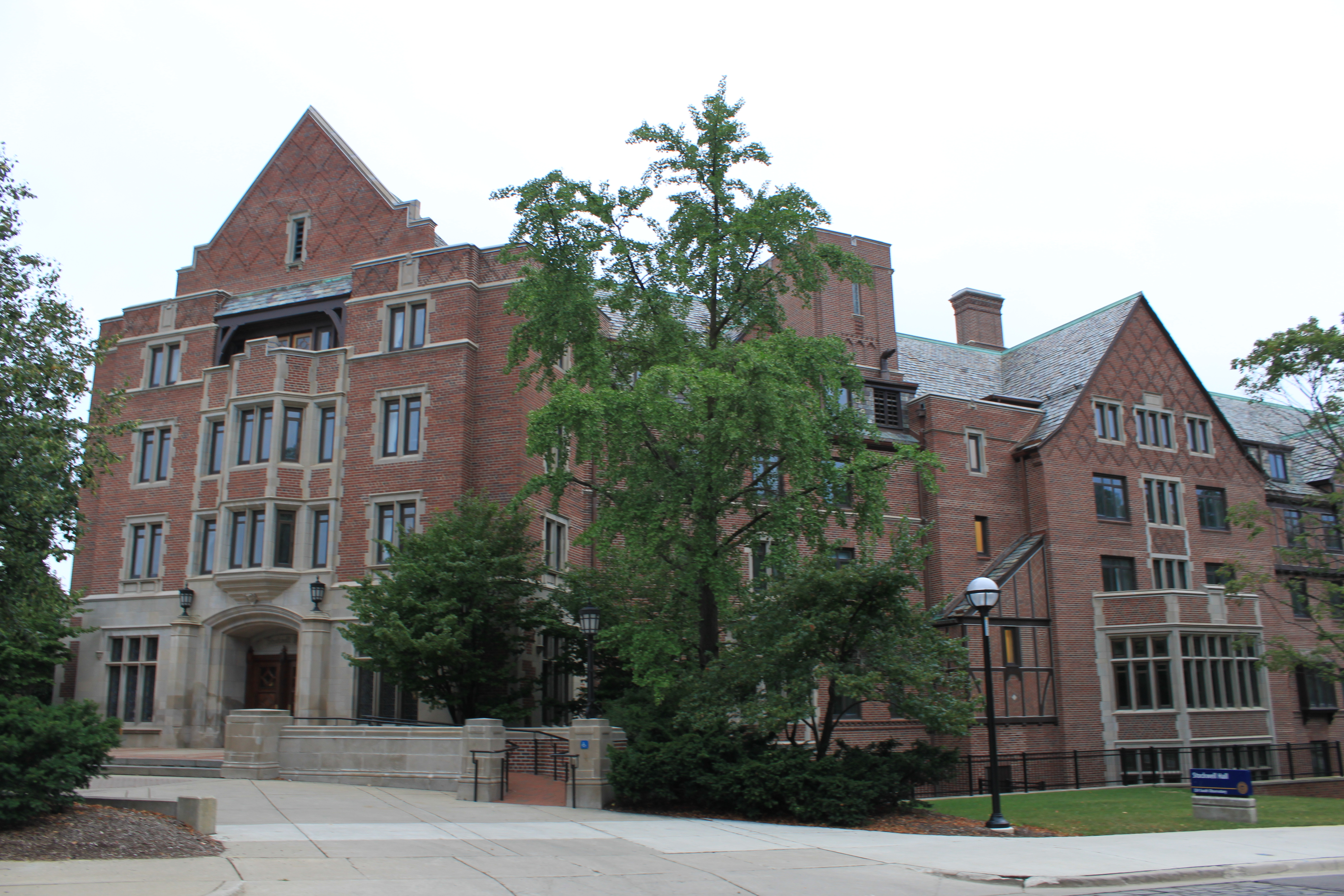
Stockwell Hall

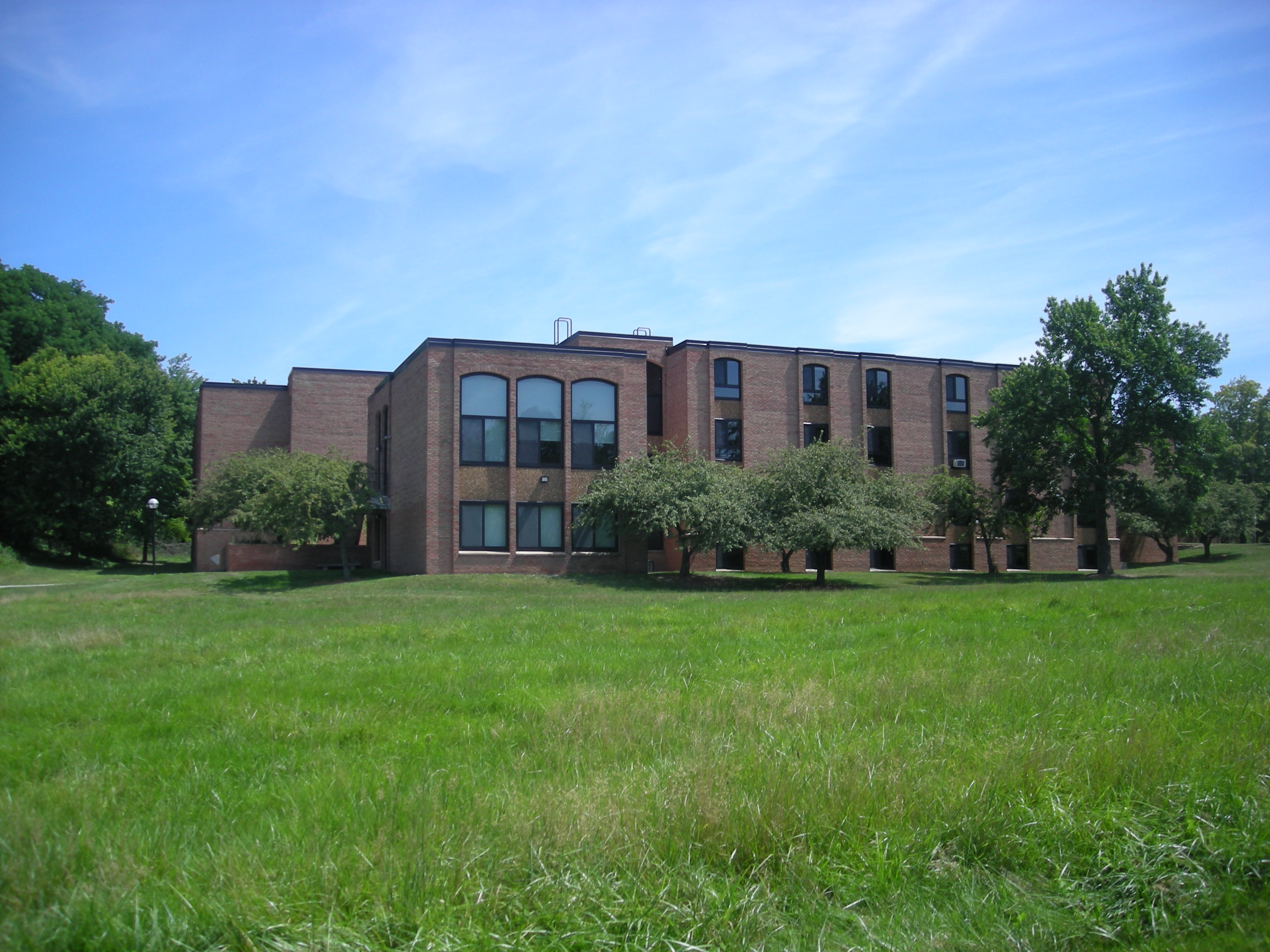
Vera Baits Houses

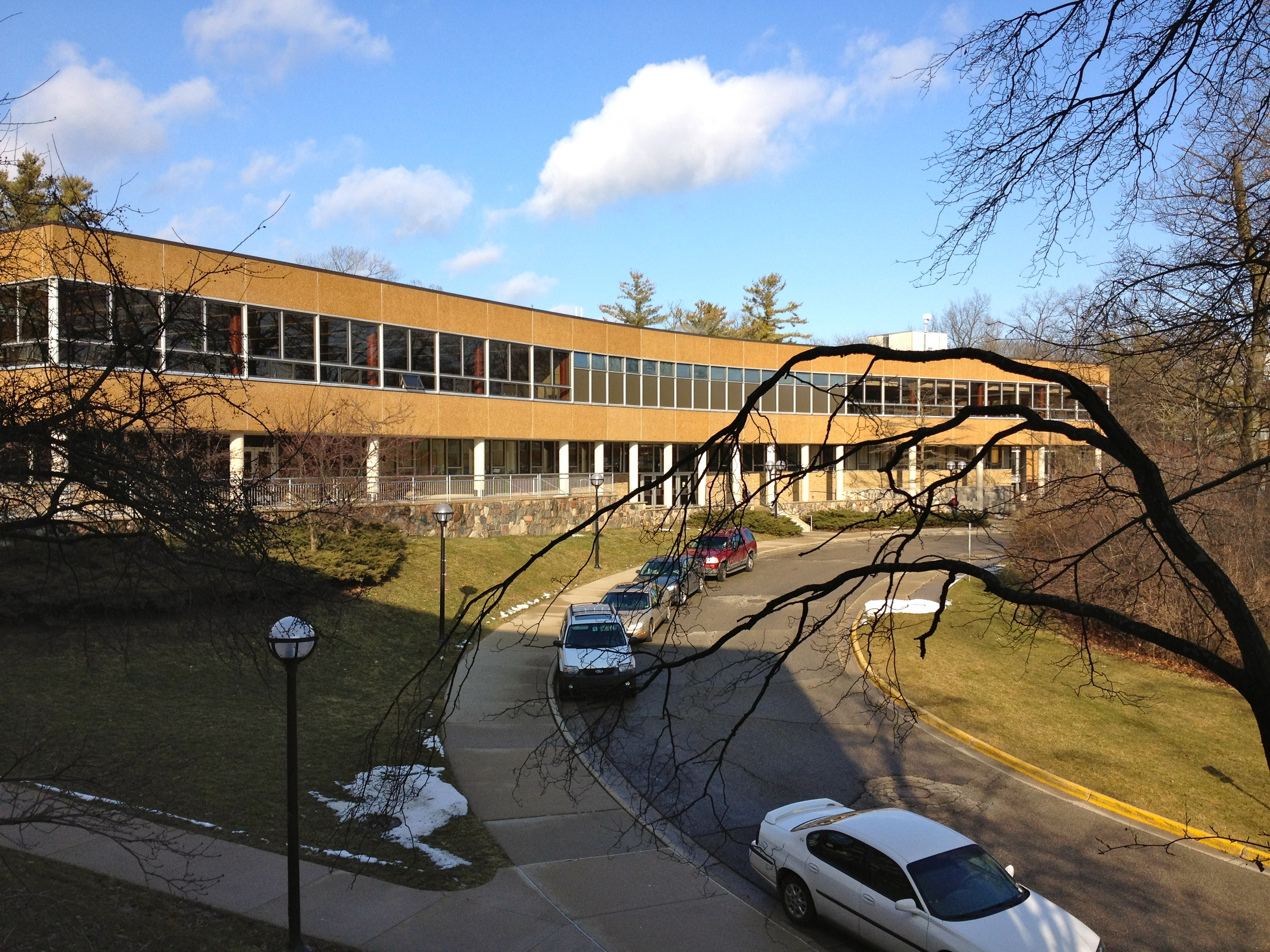
Bursley Hall

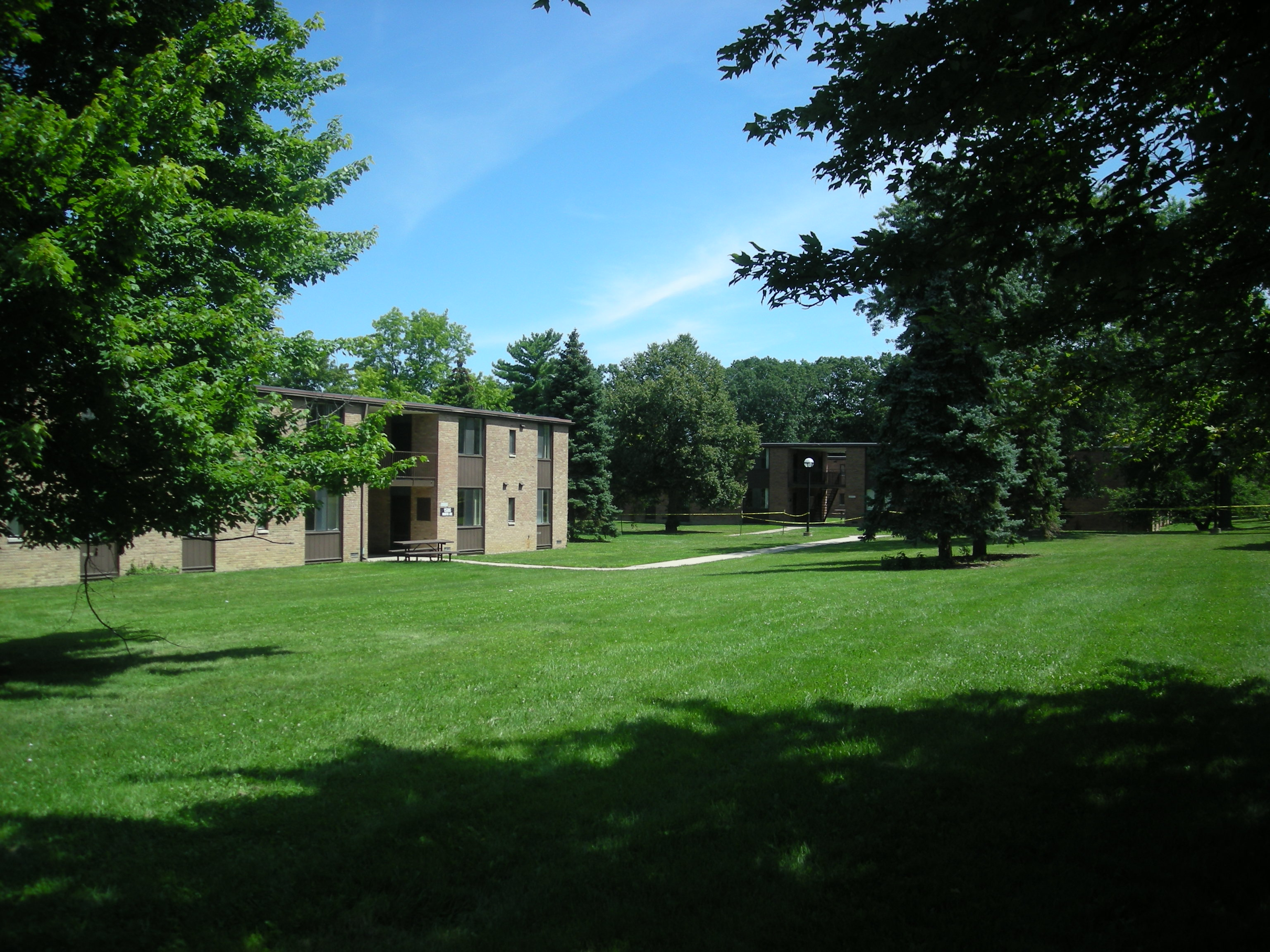
Northwood Community Apartments

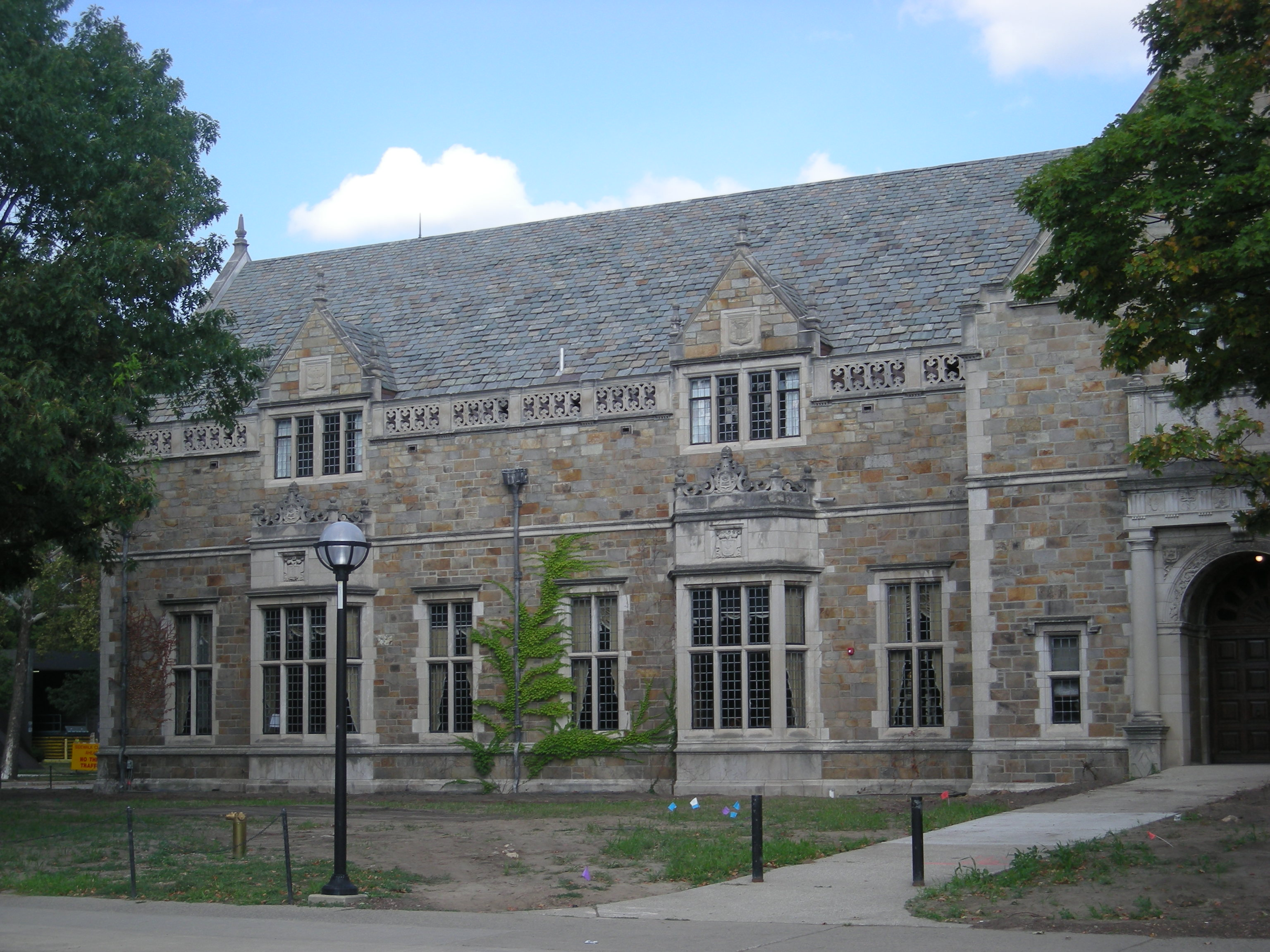
Lawyers Club
