= Mary Markley Hall =

Residence hall at the University of Michigan, USA

Coordinates: 42.2811°N 83.7288°W

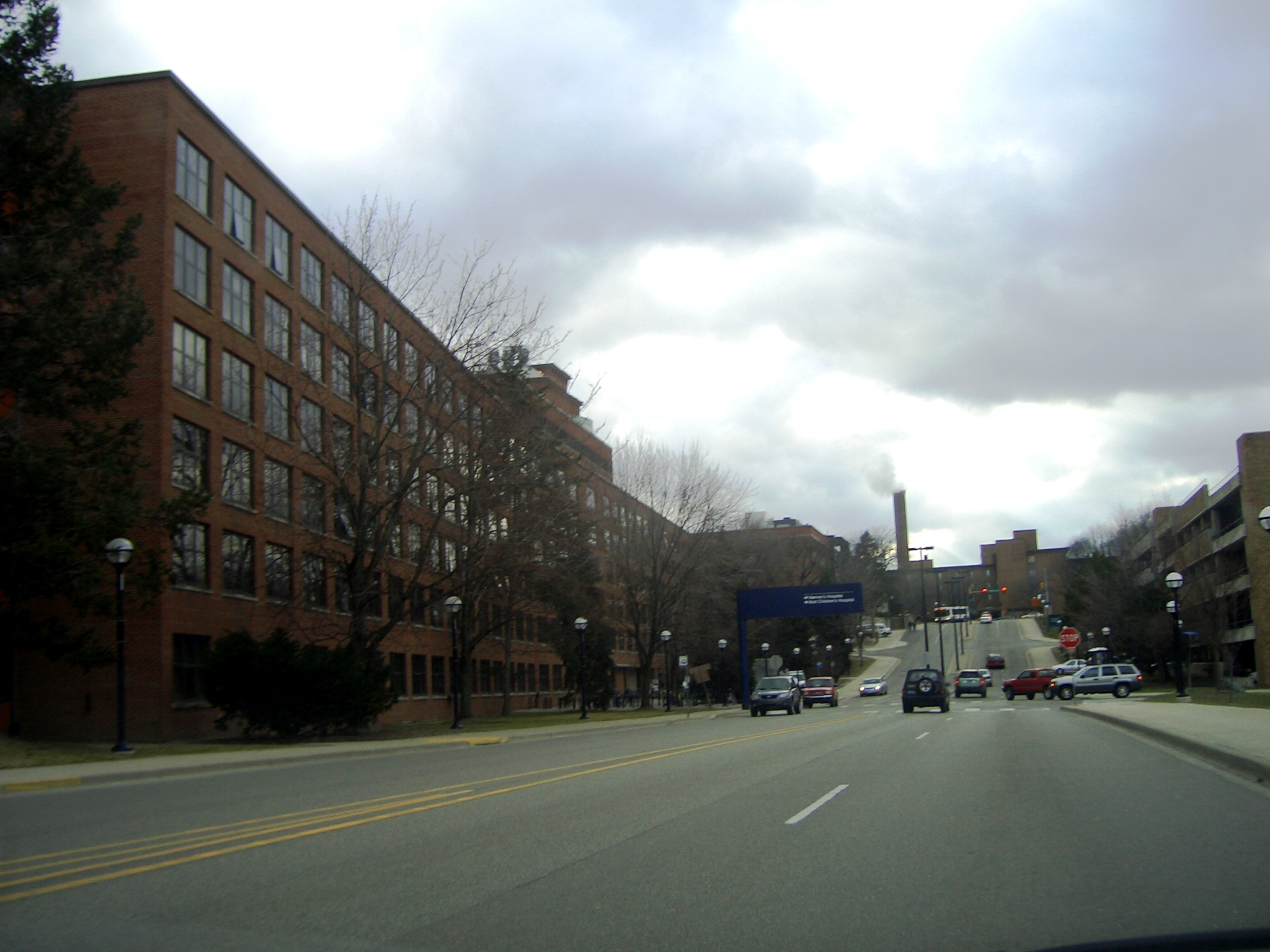
View looking West on E. Medical Center Drive. Mary Markley Hall is on the left along with the School of Public Health (partially blocked by trees). A parking garage for the University of Michigan Hospital is visible on the right, and Alice Loyd Hall is visible at the end of E. Medical Center Drive.

Mary Markley Hall is a residence hall operated by the University of Michigan University Housing in Ann Arbor.

== Hall profile ==
Markley houses approximately 1,180 students, 505 of which are female and 675 of which are male - 100% first-year students excluding the Resident Advisors. Markley is home to University Housing's First Year Experience Program (FYE). The Resident Staff consist of: 3 Residence Hall Directors, 1 Community Center Manager, 33 Resident Advisors, 5 Community Assistants, 2 Diversity Peer Educators (DPE), and, formerly, 1 Peer Academic Success Specialist (PASS). It is allocated 4 Michigan RHA representatives, 2 each from the Hall and Multicultural councils.

Markley Hall is a coeducational residence hall with an H-shaped floor plan consisting of four wings. Markley is co-ed by hall, with the exception of one hall which is co-ed by room. Halls are named in honor of significant women and men.

== History ==
Named in honor of Mary Butler Markley, a distinguished faculty widow who had been active in alumnae affairs, Mary Markley Hall was completed in 1959 at a cost of $6.1 million. Originally designed to provide housing and dining for approximately 1000 women, Markley Hall's overall layout embodies simplistic and routine arrangements; most resident rooms are doubles. In 1963, Markley Hall became co-educational.

Famous past residents include comedians Randy and Jason Sklar professionally known as the Sklar Brothers, and Tommy Dye.

== Location ==
Mary Markley Hall is located at 1503 Washington Heights: ZIP code 48109. The hall is a part of the "Hill Neighborhood," which is an area on the northeast corner of UM's central campus. The hall is separated from the other area residence halls by the School of Public Health. However, the other residence halls on "The Hill" are located along Palmer Field. The area beneath the skyway that connects the School of Public Health's two buildings is prone to trapping strong gusts of air, thus leading Markley residents who must regularly pass through to dub it "the Wind Tunnel."

Markley Hall is in between the University Hospital campus to the north (across East Medical Center Drive), Forest Hill Cemetery to the south (across Washington Heights), the Arbor Heights Center and the Nichols Arboretum (to the east), and the University of Michigan School of Public Health (to the west).

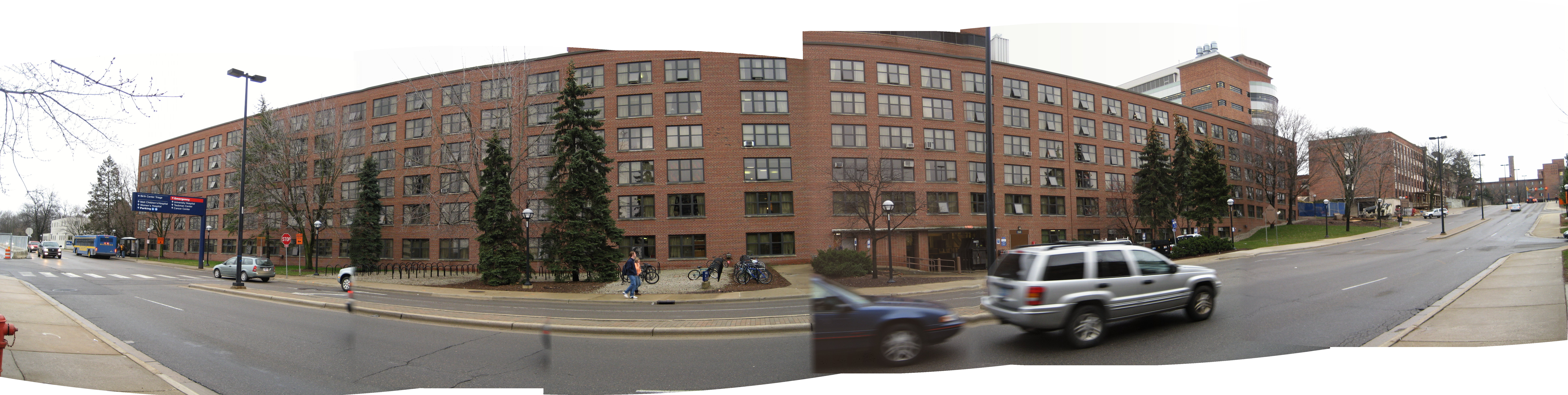
A panorama taken in early 2007, of the "back" of Mary Markley Hall. The picture was taken from the bus stop that is across East Medical Center Drive from the building.

== Facilities ==
Markley offers the only dining hall in the Hill Neighborhood other than the Hill Dining Center at Mosher-Jordan Hall. Also it has a Residential Computing Site, four laundry facilities, a Community Learning Center, one lounge serving the entire hall, numerous floor lounges, and one multi-cultural lounge. Markley features five elevators: two normal elevators, two (somewhat hidden) freight-style elevators which serve the four wings of the building, plus one staff-only elevator that serves on the loading dock kitchen and front desk, although it is not unusual for at least one elevator to be broken at any given time. During the 2006–07 school year, the Markley Hall Council made significant enhancements to the floor lounges by purchasing numerous ping pong tables, televisions, and foosball tables for student use.

== Transportation at Markley ==
Parking is not officially available for students residing in Mary Markley Hall, however, a variety of public and university transportation options exist. University of Michigan buses are free to use, to both university students/staff and non-affiliated individuals. AAATA (also known as "The Ride") buses cost $1.50 per ride normally, however, anyone with a valid Mcard (U of M I.D. card) may ride the AAATA buses for free as a part of the "MRide" program at the university.

=== University bus routes serving Markley ===
- Commuter Northbound
- Commuter Southbound
- UMHS Intercampus
- Med Express

=== AAATA bus routes serving Markley ===
- Route 1U: Pontiac University
- Route 2(A/B): Plymouth
- Route 4: Washtenaw
- Route 14: Geddes – E. Stadium
- Route 18: Miller–University
- Route 609: Dexter–University

These routes stop in front of Markley at the Michigan Medicine, but the stop is called "University Hospital, Mott" which is a part of the Michigan Medicine.
