= Charles Ezra Greene =

First dean of the University of Michigan College of Engineering

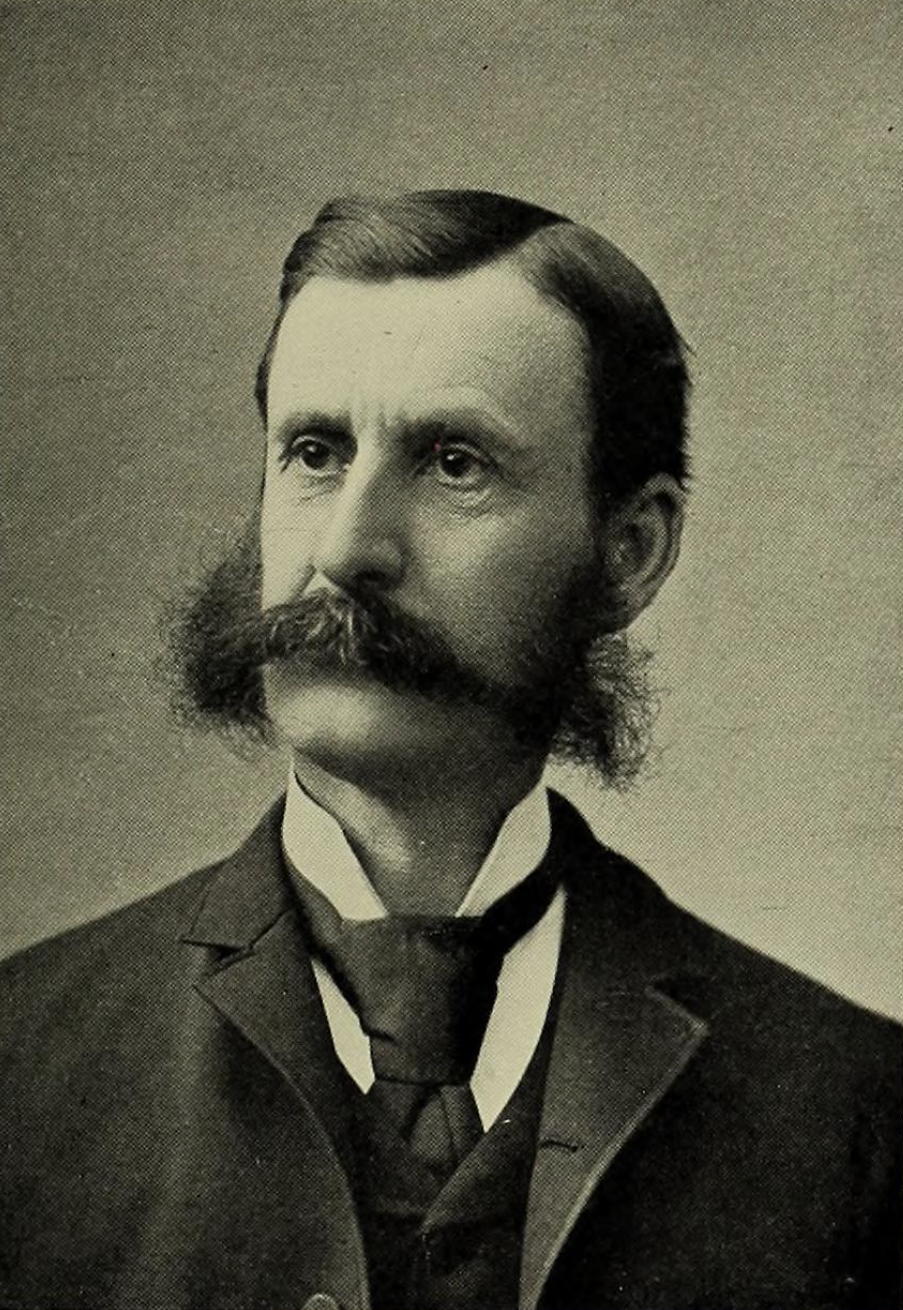
- Born: February 12, 1842; Cambridge, Massachusetts, US
- Died: 1903; Ann Arbor, Michigan, US
- Education: Harvard College (B.A. 1862); M.I.T., (B.S. 1868)
- Occupations: Professor of Civil Engineering, 1872-1903; Dean, Univ. of Michigan School of Engineering, 1895-1903
- Employer: University of Michigan
- Spouse: Florence Emerson (m. 1872)
- Children: Albert Emerson, Florence Wentworth
- Parent(s): Rev. James Diman Greene, Sarah Adeline (Durell) Greene

Charles Ezra Greene (February 12, 1842 – 1903) was an American civil engineer, born in Cambridge, Massachusetts.

He graduated from Harvard University in 1862 and at Massachusetts Institute of Technology in 1863, served as quartermaster during the last two years of the Civil War, and was United States assistant engineer from 1870 to 1872, when, for part of a year, he was city engineer of Bangor, Maine.

In the same year, he became connected with the engineering department of the University of Michigan. In 1895, he became the first dean of the University of Michigan College of Engineering, a position he held until his death.

Greene House and Greene Lounge, located within the East Quad dormitory on the University of Michigan's Central Campus, is named in his honor.

He was an associate editor of the Engineering News from 1876 - 1877. His publications include:

- Graphical Method for the Analysis of Bridge Trusses (1876)
- Trusses and Arches: Graphics for Engineers, Architects, and Builders (three volumes, 1876–79; third edition, 1903)
- Notes on Rankine's Civil Engineering (1891)
- Structural Mechanics (1897; second edition, 1905)
