= Betsy Barbour House =

Residence hall

Coordinates: 42°16′34.44″N 83°44′27.93″W

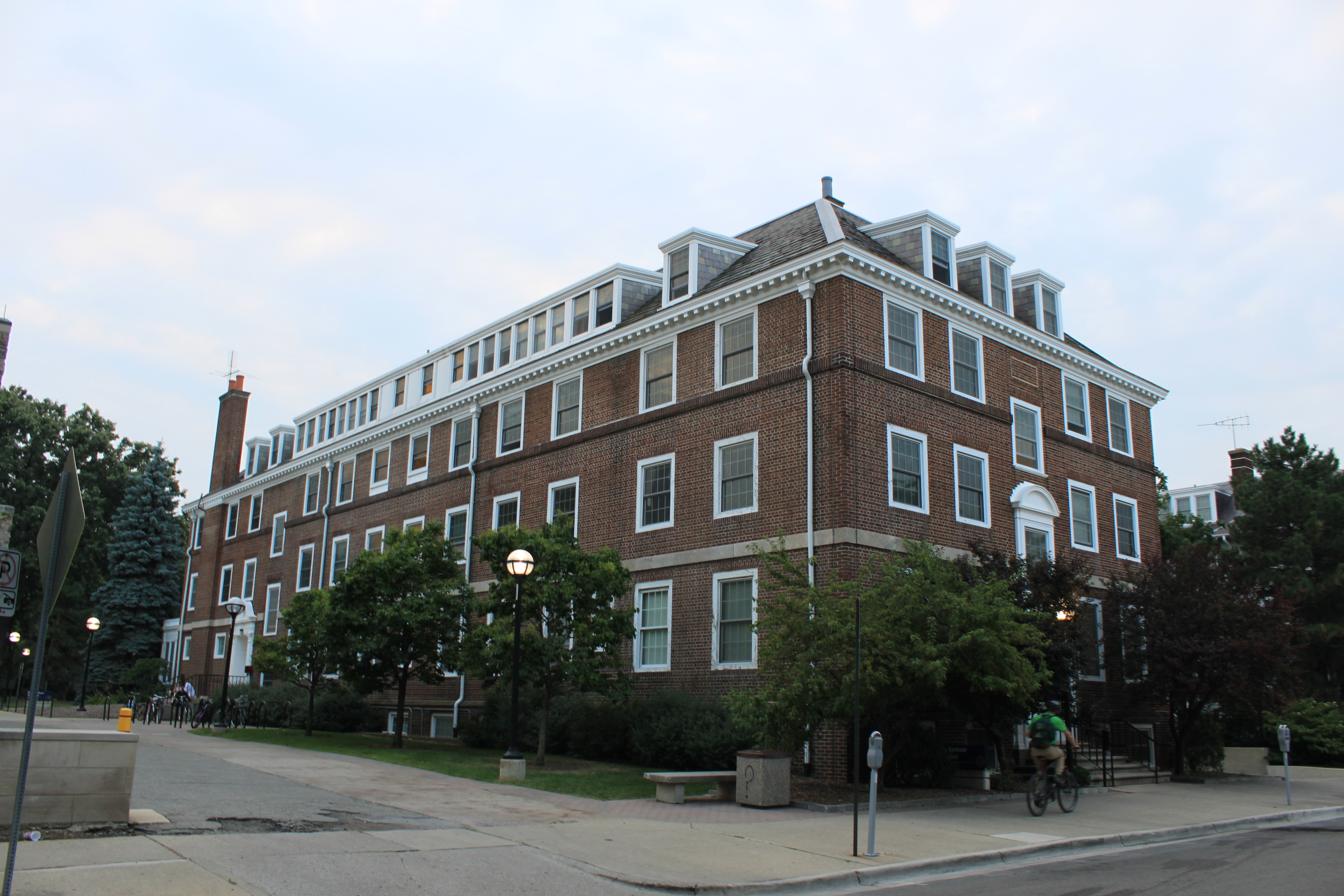
Betsy Barbour House, view from Maynard St.

Betsy Barbour House (Barbour) is a residence hall operated by University of Michigan Housing at the University of Michigan in Ann Arbor.

== Hall Profile ==
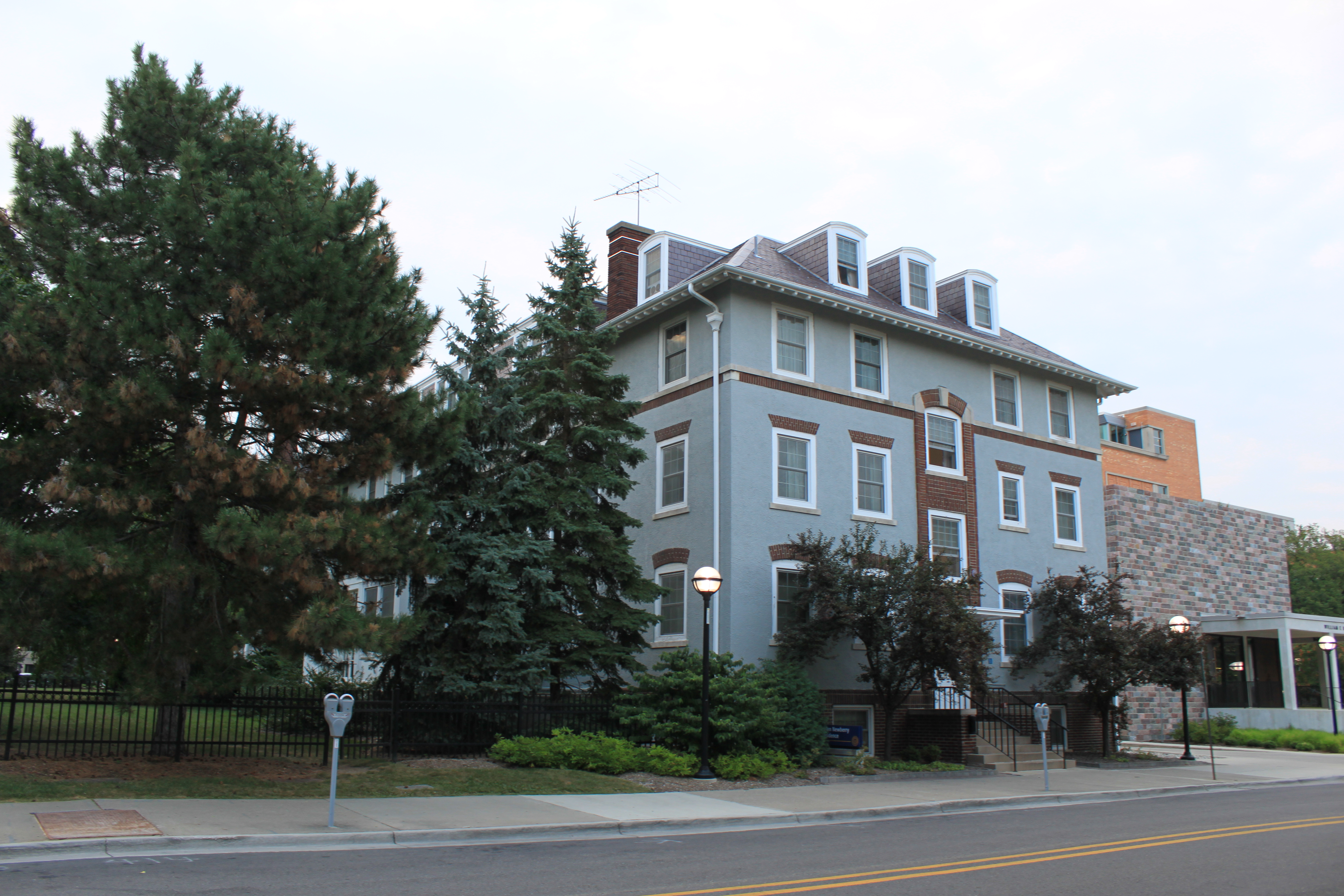
Helen Newberry House, view from Maynard St.

Barbour houses approximately 120 occupants, 70% of which are freshmen. The residence is one of three all-female residence halls on campus. The hall contains a laundry room, two lounges, front desk, and multiple kitchenettes. It shares resources with its next-door sister hall Helen Newberry House, which contains the exercise/dance room, kitchen, and computing site.

== Location ==
Located just across the street from Angell Hall, Barbour is one of the closest residence halls to UM's central campus. The street address is 420 South State Street.

== History ==
Betsy Barbour Dormitory was Designed by World Renown architect Albert Kahn in 1917. The main entry was altered in 1930 and a passageway connecting Betsy Barbour to Helen Newberry was designed in 1933. (Albert Kahn Project number 829_Albert Kahn Associates project list ) Barbour was built in 1920, as a gift from Levi Barbour, a former UM Regent. One of his sponsored students from Japan, Kikuchi Matsu, had died of tuberculosis as a result of inadequate living conditions at UM, and this prompted his decision to help construct new housing.
