= Vera Burridge Baits =

American educattor

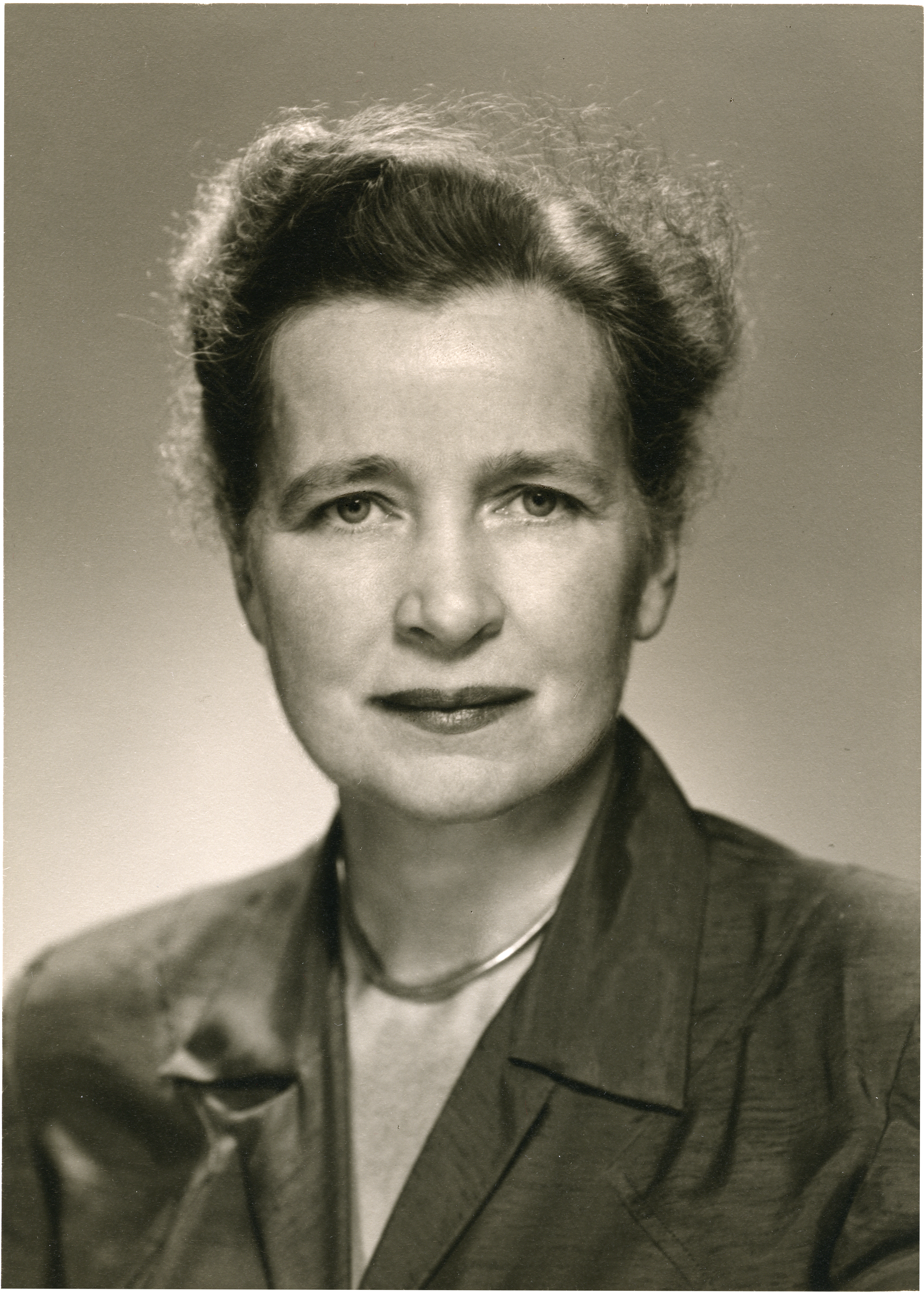
- Vera Baits, Bentley Historical Library, University of Michigan

Board of Regents University of Michigan
- In office 1943–1957

Personal details
- Born: May 15, 1892 Detroit, Michigan
- Died: November 9, 1963 Grosse Pointe Farms, Michigan
- Spouse: Stuart G. Baits
- Children: Jane (Shedd) and Stephen
- Education: University of Michigan

Vera Mildred Burridge Baits (1892–1963) was a member of the Board of Regents for the University of Michigan from 1943 to 1958.

== Early life and education ==
Vera Mildred Burridge was born in Detroit, Michigan on May 15, 1892 to George and Ellen (Roe) Burridge. She earned her Bachelor of Arts degree from the University of Michigan in 1915, and a Teachers' Certificate that same year. While at the University of Michigan she was a member of the Delta Gamma sorority, Mortar Board and the Women's Editor of The Michigan Daily. Burridge attended Graduate School at the University of Chicago from 1916 to 1917.

== Work ==
Before marrying Stuart Baits, Burridge taught school for one year in the Ironwood, Michigan school district, taught English for two years at the Riverside-Brookfield High School in Illinois, and taught English for two years at Northeastern High School in the Detroit Public Schools system. She also spent a summer writing for the Chicago Record-Herald newspaper.

== Organizations ==
Baits was very active in volunteer organizations. Her first membership was in the Detroit Association of University of women, beginning in 1918. She served as their President, as delegate to the Alumnae Council for five years and a member of the Alumni Advisory Council. For two years she was a member of the Board of Governors of Alumnae House and for four years served on the Board of Governors for Martha Cook Building residence. Baits was civic-minded, serving as Chairman of the Metropolitan Education Committee, the Detroit Young Women's Christian Association (4 years), Chairman of Central Branch, Detroit Young Women's Christian Association (YWCA), and Member of Speakers' Bureau, Detroit chapter of American Red Cross. She was also active in cultural activities in her community of Grosse Pointe.

== UM Regent ==
Baits was the second woman to be appointed a university regent, by Michigan Governor Harry Kelly on May 14, 1943, to complete the term of Franklin M. Cook, who had died. In 1949 she was elected on the Republican ticket to an eight-year term ending on December 31, 1957. As regent, Baits supported the cause of higher education and leadership among the university alumnae.

== Awards ==
Baits was awarded the Distinguished Alumni Service Award of the University of Michigan on June 13, 1959 for her work on behalf of Higher Education and her contributions as a regent of the University. Baits I & Baits II Houses were opened in the fall of 1966 to fulfill the needs of the students of the upper class and graduate students.

University of Michigan Alumnae Club of Grosse Pointe established a four-year tuition scholarship in memory of Baits.

== Personal life ==
Burridge married Stuart Gordon Baits 1914 B.E.E. of Hudson Motor Car Company in 1919. They had two children, Jane (Mrs. Robert Gordon Shedd) A.B. in 1942, and Stephen Stuart BSE (M.E.) in 1950.
