= Scheuchzer =

Scheuchzer is a surname. Notable people with the surname include:

- Johann Caspar Scheuchzer (1702–1729), Swiss naturalist, physician and writer
- Johann Gaspar Scheuchzer (1684–1738), Swiss botanist and plant collector
- Johann Jakob Scheuchzer (1672–1733), Swiss physician and natural scientist
- Wilhelm Scheuchzer (1803–1866), Swiss painter

== See also ==
- Scheuchzeria
- Eriophorum scheuchzeri
- Campanula scheuchzeri
- Scheuchzerhorn
