= Johann Rudolf Rahn =

Johann Rudolf Rahn may refer to:

- Johann Rudolf Rahn (died 1786) (1742–1786), professor of ethics at the Carolinum in Zurich, brother of Johann Heinrich Rahn (physician)
- Johann Rudolf Rahn (art historian) (1841–1912), Swiss art historian
