= Naturforschende Gesellschaft in Zürich =

Society founded in 1746 to promote science

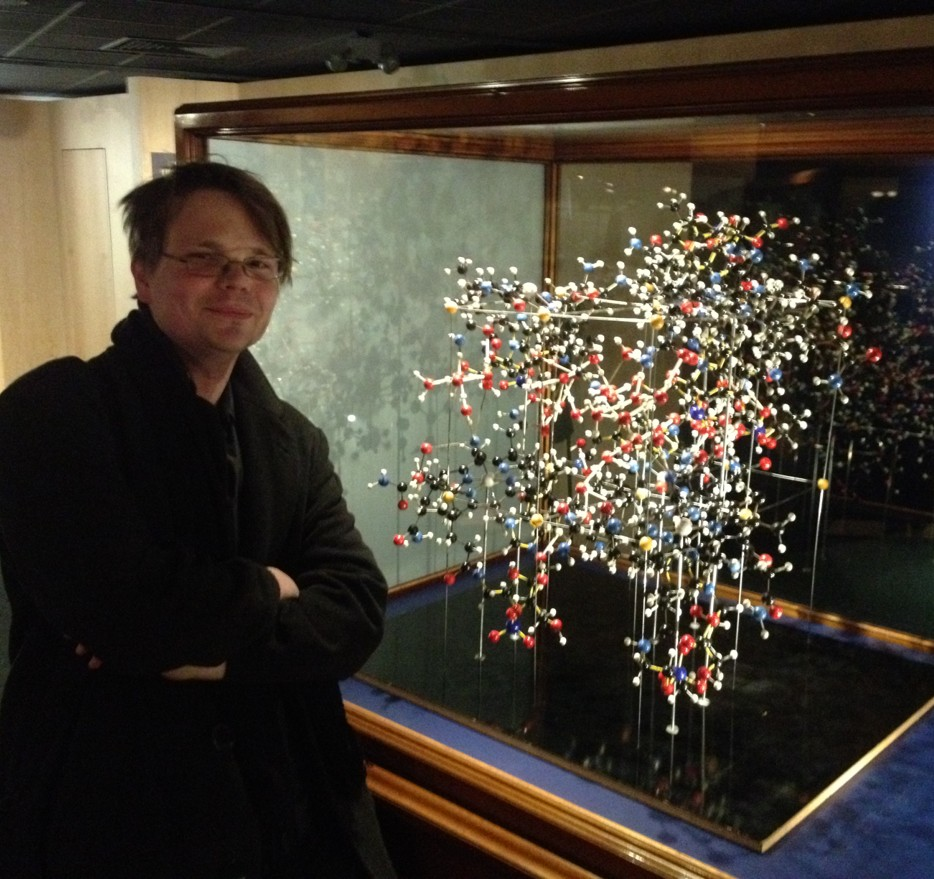
The current president Dr Rene Martin Oetterli MRSC next to the model of vitamin B12's crystal structure by Dorothy Crowfoot-Hodgkin.

The Society of Natural Sciences in Zurich (Naturforschende Gesellschaft in Zürich) is a society founded in 1746 for the promotion of natural sciences. It was founded by Johannes Gessner and other citizens in Zurich as the Physicalische Societät and is one of the oldest scientific societies in both Switzerland and the German-speaking world. As of 2026, there were around 470 members, and the president is Rene Oetterli. Within the Swiss Academy of Natural Sciences, the NGZH is a member organisation of the Natural Sciences Platform.

== History ==
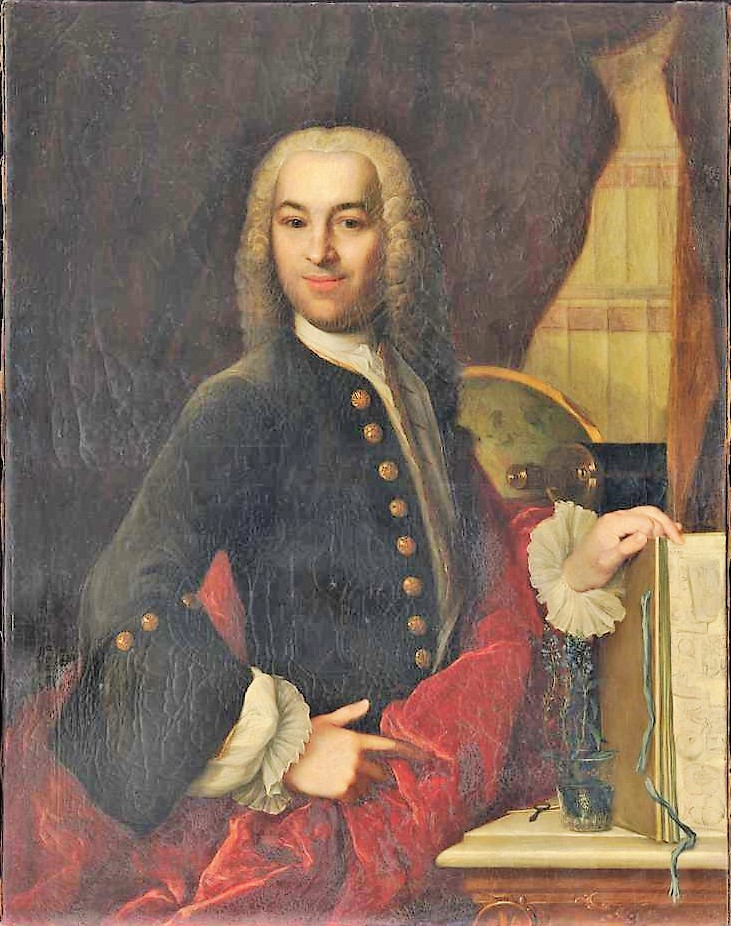
Portrait of Johannes Gessner - natural scientist, city physician, professor of physics and mathematics, polymath, and founder of the Natural Science Society in Zurich (NGZH)

In the Age of Enlightenment, people devoted themselves to the then flourishing natural sciences, i.e., in addition to physics, also mathematics, technology, agriculture, medicine, pharmacy, and especially natural history (which included descriptive natural sciences such as zoology, botany, meteorology, geology, geography, and astronomy). Zurich citizens tended to expand and complete their academic studies at foreign universities. The local university, the Carolinum at the Grossmünster, enjoyed great prestige for philology, philosophy, and theology—and increasingly also for the full professorship (then canon) of physics and mathematics established in 1558. But the academics who returned home lacked "collaborative scientific work, mutual stimulation, and the exchange of ideas." Thus, they came across " to doctor and master of the canon Johannes Gessner, whose experience and knowledge could be helpful in the implementation of such a project. […] This proposal was soon followed by a private conversation in which Gessner was encouraged […] to hold public lectures on physics accompanied by experiments here in Zurich, as in England […].”

Thus, on August 10, 1746, the Natural Science Society of Zurich (NGZH) was founded and took on tasks otherwise reserved for academies and universities. It maintained a botanical garden and an observatory. It also built extensive collections of scientific instruments and a comprehensive library. It kept records of the daily weather and was responsible for accurate timekeeping in Zurich. From 1757 to 1840, the NGZH was the main tenant of the premises in the Zunfthaus zur Meisen, which housed the meeting room, a large part of the collection, an astronomical observatory, and a chemical laboratory. Great figures such as Johann Wolfgang von Goethe (1775) and Alessandro Volta (1777) attended meetings here. Due to the growing number of members, the rooms of the guild rooms (Meisen, Rüden, Zimmerleuten, Schmidstube) became increasingly unsuitable for meetings, so that in 1943 the society finally moved entirely into the large lecture halls of the ETH Zurich, which had since been founded.

At its meetings, experiments were also conducted, following the example of other scientific societies, such as the Royal Society. The society's activities and collections benefited the science faculties of the University of Zurich, founded in 1833, and the ETH Zurich (ETH) opened in 1855, the Swiss Federal Laboratories for Materials Science and Technology (EMPA), founded in 1880, and the Zentralbibliothek Zürich (ZBZ), founded in 1916.

== Activities ==
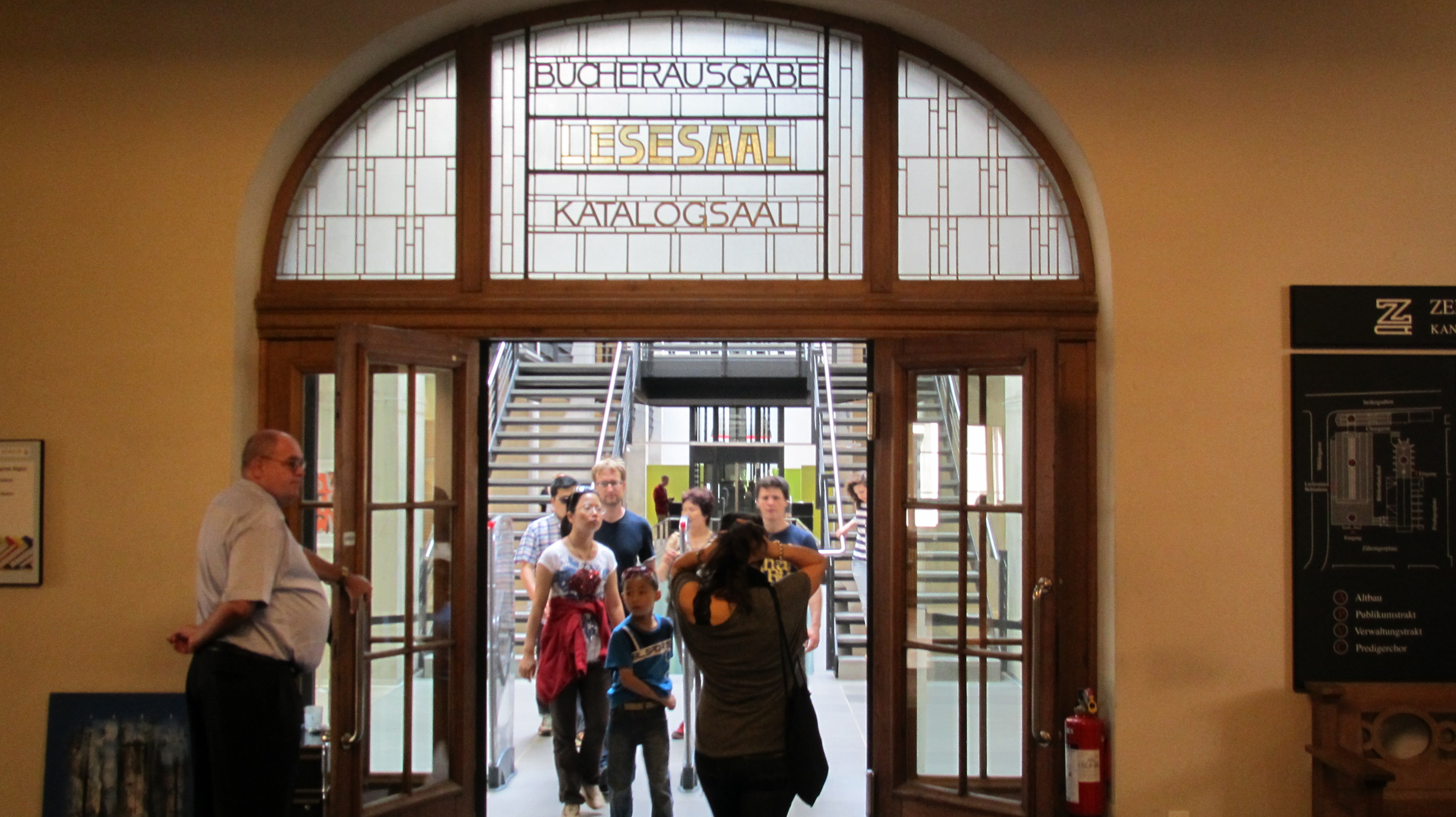
Zurich Central Library

The NGZH currently hosts a partially online lecture series with guest speakers each year, as well as organizing excursions and research trips. It publishes shorter scholarly articles in the Vierteljahrsschrift (established 1856, previously the Verhandlungen (1826–1837) and the Mitteilungen (1847–1856)) and a more comprehensive volume, the Neujahrsblatt (established 1799), which appears on December 31st and is sold at the Zentralbibliothek (Zurich Central Library) on the morning of January 2nd. Members receive the Neujahrsblatt by mail.

All publications since the founding year are recorded electronically and freely accessible on the association's website.

Due to the universities founded in Zurich and the changing academic publishing environment, the NGZH's scope of work and self-image have evolved. The society sees itself as committed to fostering dialogue between the individual disciplines and with the public – science communication and the promotion of STEM subjects. To fulfill this mission despite increasing club fatigue, especially among the younger generation, the society has expanded its communication channels to include social media and a monthly podcast (NGZH Journal Club). The latter is a scientific review of the past month by the NGZH. Barbara Schnüriger (biology), Fritz Gassmann (physics), and René Oetterli (chemistry) discuss current publications in science, technology, medicine, and mathematics.

== Membership ==
The society is public and open to everyone. It currently has approximately 473 members (as of January 2023).

=== Famous members (in alphabetical order) ===
- Pompejus Bolley (chemist)
- Rudolf Clausius (physicist, discoverer of the second law of thermodynamics)
- Carl Eduard Cramer (botanist)
- Carl Culmann (engineer)
- Peter Debye (physicist)
- Albert Einstein (physicist, discoverer of the theory of relativity)
- Arnold Escher von der Linth (geologist)
- Wilhelm Fiedler (mathematician)
- Hermann Fritz (physicist)
- Heinrich Frey (anatomist, zoologist)
- Johannes Gessner (physician, polymath)
- Johann Kaspar Horner (mathematician, astronomist)
- Oswald Heer (botanist, paleontologist, entomologist)
- Albert Heim (geologist)
- Ludimar Hermann (physiologist)
- Alfred Kleiner (physicist)
- Georg Lunge (chemist)
- Albert Mousson (physicist)
- Johann Heinrich Rahn (physician, founder of the first modern school of medicine in Zurich)
- Eduard Schär (pharmacist, toxicologist)
- Paul Scherrer (nuclear physicist. father of nuclear science in Switzerland)
- Heinrich Rudolf Schinz (zoologist)
- Erwin Schrödinger (physicist, discoverer of the Schrödinger equation)
- Heinrich Friedrich Weber (physicist)
- Pierre Weiss (physicist)
- Johannes Wislicenus (chemist)
- Laurenz Zellweger (physician)
- Gustav Zeuner (engineer)

== Bibliography ==
- "Naturforschende Gesellschaft in Zürich (NGZH)". Swiss Academy of Natural Sciences.
- "Naturforschende Gesellschaft in Zürich". 2017.
- "Mittheilungen der Naturforschenden Gesellschaft in Zürich". Katalog der Zeitschriftendatenbank (ZDB). Zeitschriftendatenbank (ZDB).
- Fischer, Hans (1966a). Conrad Gessner 1516–1565 (PDF) (in German). Zurich: Naturforschende Gesellschaft in Zürich.
