= List of mountains of Switzerland named after people =

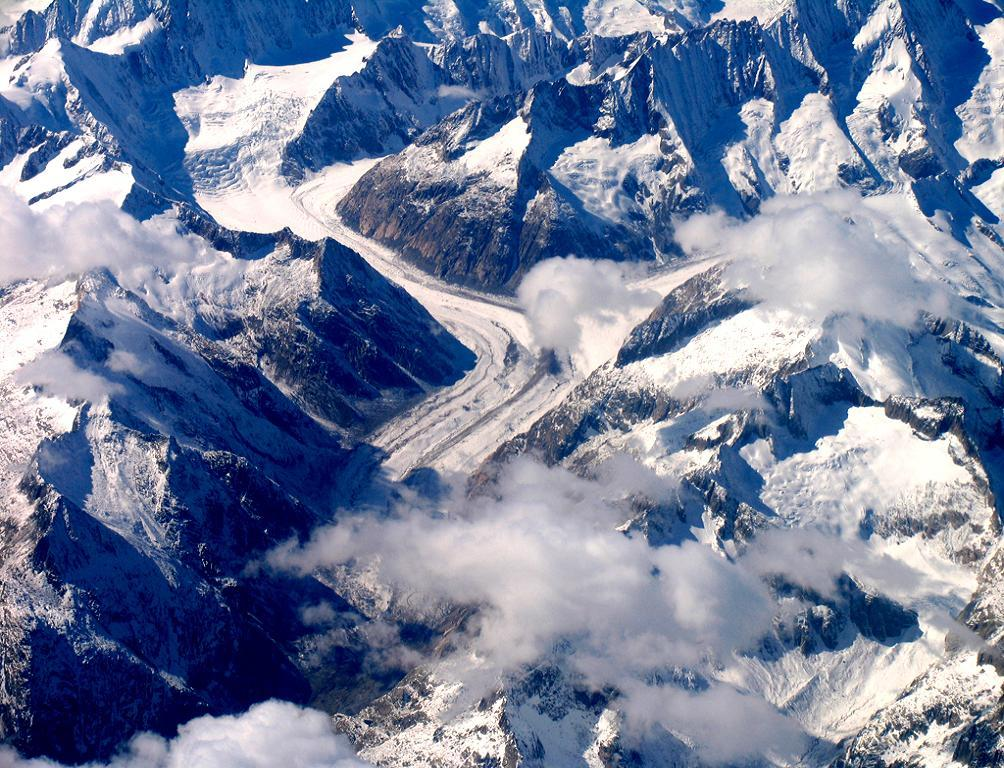
Unteraar Glacier basin where eight mountains were named from an expedition led by Louis Agassiz in 1840 (click image to see annotations)

This is a list of mountains and summits of Switzerland named after people. Only a few mountains were named after people, as it is not a common practice in Switzerland. These mountains were often named after those who were the first to climb them, but also after distinguished Swiss personalities, such as Guillaume-Henri Dufour, Henry Dunant and Louis Agassiz.

Most of the listed mountains are located in the Unteraar Glacier basin (8), on Monte Rosa (6), in the Mont Blanc massif (4) and in the Engelhörner massif (3).

== List ==
Mountain	Height (m)	Drop (m)	Coordinates	Range	Canton(s)	Namesake	First ascent	Notes
Agassizhorn	3946	199	46°32′48″N 08°06′52″E	Bernese Alps	Bern/Valais	Louis Agassiz	No	Swiss pioneering biologist and geologist, summit in the Unteraar Glacier basin
Altmann	3462	77	46°31′55″N 08°09′51″E	Bernese Alps	Bern/Valais	Johann Georg Altmann	No	Swiss historian and naturalist, summit in the Unteraar Glacier basin
Piz Amalia	2918	68	46°40′51″N 10°19′51″E	Sesvenna Alps	Graubünden	Catharina-Amalia	No	Dutch heir apparent to the throne of the Kingdom of the Netherlands, unofficial name
Pointe Burnaby	4135	30	46°07′07″N 07°43′05″E	Pennine Alps	Valais	Elizabeth Burnaby	Yes	British pioneer of mountaineering
Punta Carrel	3841	61	45°58′17″N 07°36′58″E	Pennine Alps	Valais	Jean-Antoine Carrel	No	Italian mountain guide
Desorstock	2872	15	46°33′24″N 08°11′36″E	Bernese Alps	Bern	Pierre Jean Édouard Desor	No	Swiss geologist ad naturalist, summit in the Unteraar Glacier basin
Dufourspitze	4634	2165	45°56′13″N 07°52′01″E	Pennine Alps	Valais	Guillaume-Henri Dufour	No	Swiss general and author of the Dufour Map, main summit of Monte Rosa
Dunantspitze	4632	15	45°56′13″N 07°52′04″E	Pennine Alps	Valais	Henry Dunant	No	Swiss philanthropist and founder of the Red Cross, summit on Monte Rosa
Escherhorn	3078	43	46°33′27″N 08°11′49″E	Bernese Alps	Bern	Arnold Escher von der Linth	No	Swiss geologist and mountaineer, summit in the Unteraar Glacier basin
Aiguille Forbes	3489	44	45°58′24″N 07°00′37″E	Mont Blanc massif	Valais	James David Forbes	No	British physicist and glaciologist
Gertrudspitze	2633	31	46°40′47″N 08°11′00″E	Bernese Alps	Bern	Gertrude Bell	Yes	British writer and traveller
Punta Gnifetti (Signalkuppe)	4554	102	45°55′38″N 07°52′37″E	Pennine Alps	Valais	Giovanni Gnifetti	Yes	Italian parish priest from Alagna Valsesia, summit on Monte Rosa
Grunerhorn	3431	21	46°32′29″N 08°10′53″E	Bernese Alps	Bern	Gottlieb Sigmund Gruner	No	Swiss cartographer and geologist, summit in the Unteraar Glacier basin
Hugihorn	3647	82	46°34′22″N 08°08′49″E	Bernese Alps	Bern	Franz Joseph Hugi	No	Swiss geologist and pioneer in winter mountaineering, summit in the Unteraar Glacier basin
Piz Jenatsch	3251	131	46°32′33″N 09°43′00″E	Albula Alps	Graubünden	Jörg Jenatsch	No	Swiss political leader during the Thirty Years' War
Kingspitz	2621	111	46°40′32″N 08°10′35″E	Bernese Alps	Bern	Seymour King	Yes	British banker and politician
Pointe Kurz	3680	174	45°56′18″N 07°02′08″E	Mont Blanc massif	Valais	Marcel (Louis) Kurz	Yes	Swiss climber and topographer
Lüdwigshöhe	4341	58	45°55′02″N 07°51′44″E	Pennine Alps	Valais	Ludwig von Welden	Yes	Austrian army topographer, summit on Monte Rosa
Pointe Morin	3590	46	45°56′37″N 07°02′12″E	Mont Blanc massif	Valais	Jean-Antoine Morin	Yes	
Parrotspitze	4432	136	45°55′11″N 07°52′17″E	Pennine Alps	Valais	Friedrich Parrot	No	German naturalist who attempted the ascent, summit on Monte Rosa
Pilatus	2128	585	46°58′26″N 08°14′28″E	Emmental Alps	Nidwalden/Obwalden	Pontius Pilate	No	Roman prefect whose spirit was believed to haunt the mountain
Aiguille Purtscheller	3475	95	45°59′29″N 07°00′45″E	Mont Blanc massif	Valais	Ludwig Purtscheller	Yes	Austrian mountaineer
Pic Tyndall	4241	15	45°58′30″N 07°39′16″E	Pennine Alps	Valais	John Tyndall	Yes	British physicist, first ascent when attempting to climb the Matterhorn
Scheuchzerhorn	3456	116	46°32′38″N 08°11′24″E	Bernese Alps	Bern	Johann Jakob Scheuchzer	No	Swiss paleontologist, summit in the Unteraar Glacier basin
Studerhorn	3634	226	46°31′58″N 08°08′52″E	Bernese Alps	Bern/Valais	Gottlieb Samuel Studer	No	Swiss draughtsman and mountaineer, summit in the Unteraar Glacier basin
Ulrichshorn	3925	75	46°31′55″N 07°58′02″E	Pennine Alps	Valais	Melchior Ulrich	Yes	Swiss mountain guide
Ulrichspitze	2637	50	46°40′44″N 08°11′02″E	Bernese Alps	Bern	Ulrich Fuhrer	Yes	Swiss mountain guide
Zumsteinspitze	4563	110	45°55′55″N 07°52′17″E	Pennine Alps	Valais	Joseph Zumstein	Yes	Italian topographer from Gressoney, summit on Monte Rosa

== See also ==
- List of Swiss people
