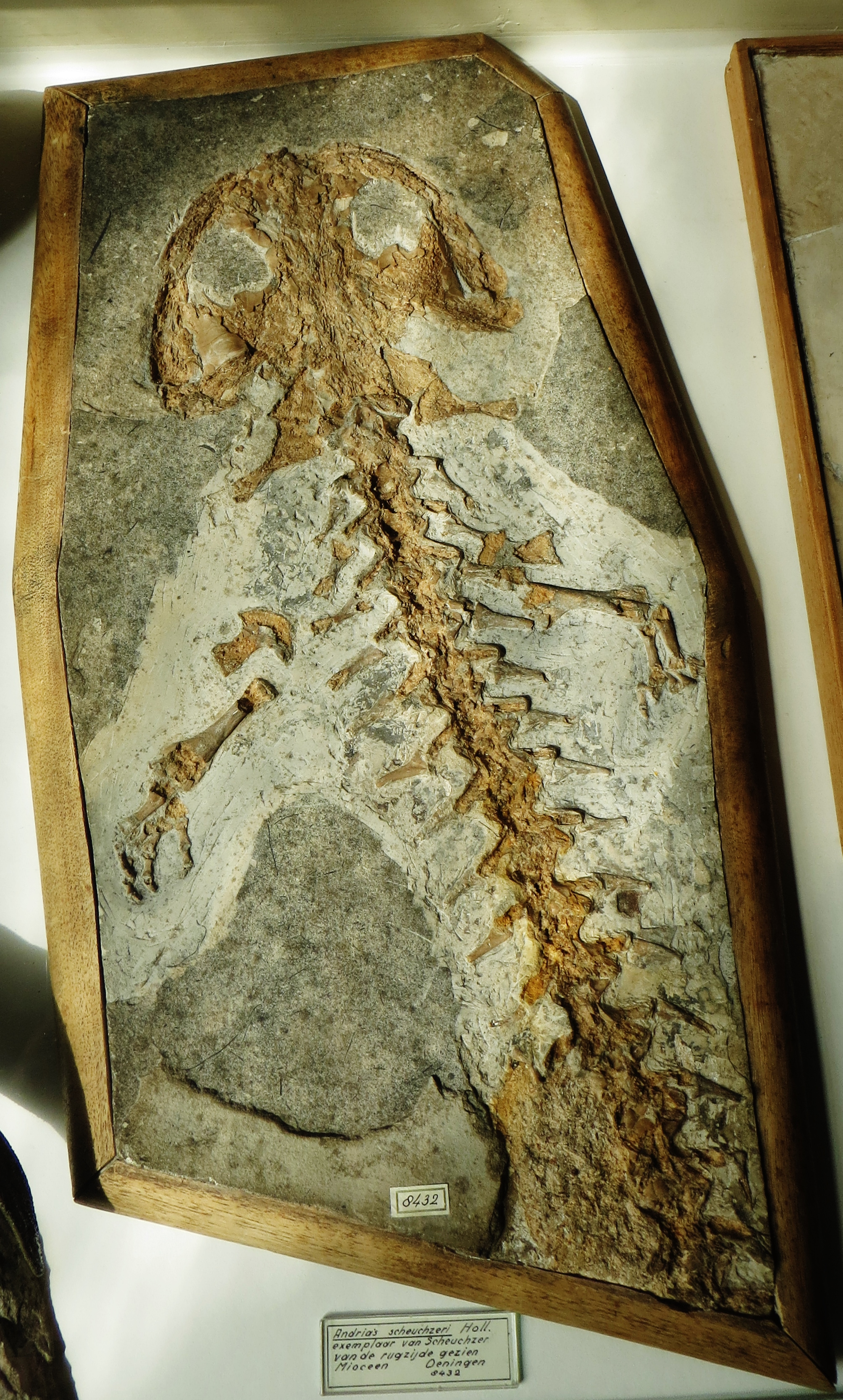
- Holotype, TSMNH 8432, at Teylers Museum, Scheuchzer's Homo diluvii testis

Scientific classification
- Kingdom: Animalia
- Phylum: Chordata
- Class: Amphibia
- Order: Urodela
- Family: Cryptobranchidae
- Genus: Andrias
- Species: †A. scheuchzeri

Binomial name
- †Andrias scheuchzeri (Holl, 1829)

Synonyms
- Cryptobranchus scheuchzeri (authority unknown); "Homo diluvii testis" Scheuchzer, 1726; Salamandra scheuchzeri Holl, 1829

= Andrias scheuchzeri =

Andrias scheuchzeri Temporal range: Late Oligocene to Late Pliocene, 28–2.58 Ma

Extinct species of amphibian

Andrias scheuchzeri is an extinct species of giant salamander belonging to the genus Andrias, which also contains the closely related living Asian giant salamanders. It is known from Oligocene to Pliocene aged deposits primarily from Central Europe, but possibly as far east as Western Siberia and eastern Kazakhstan.

== History ==
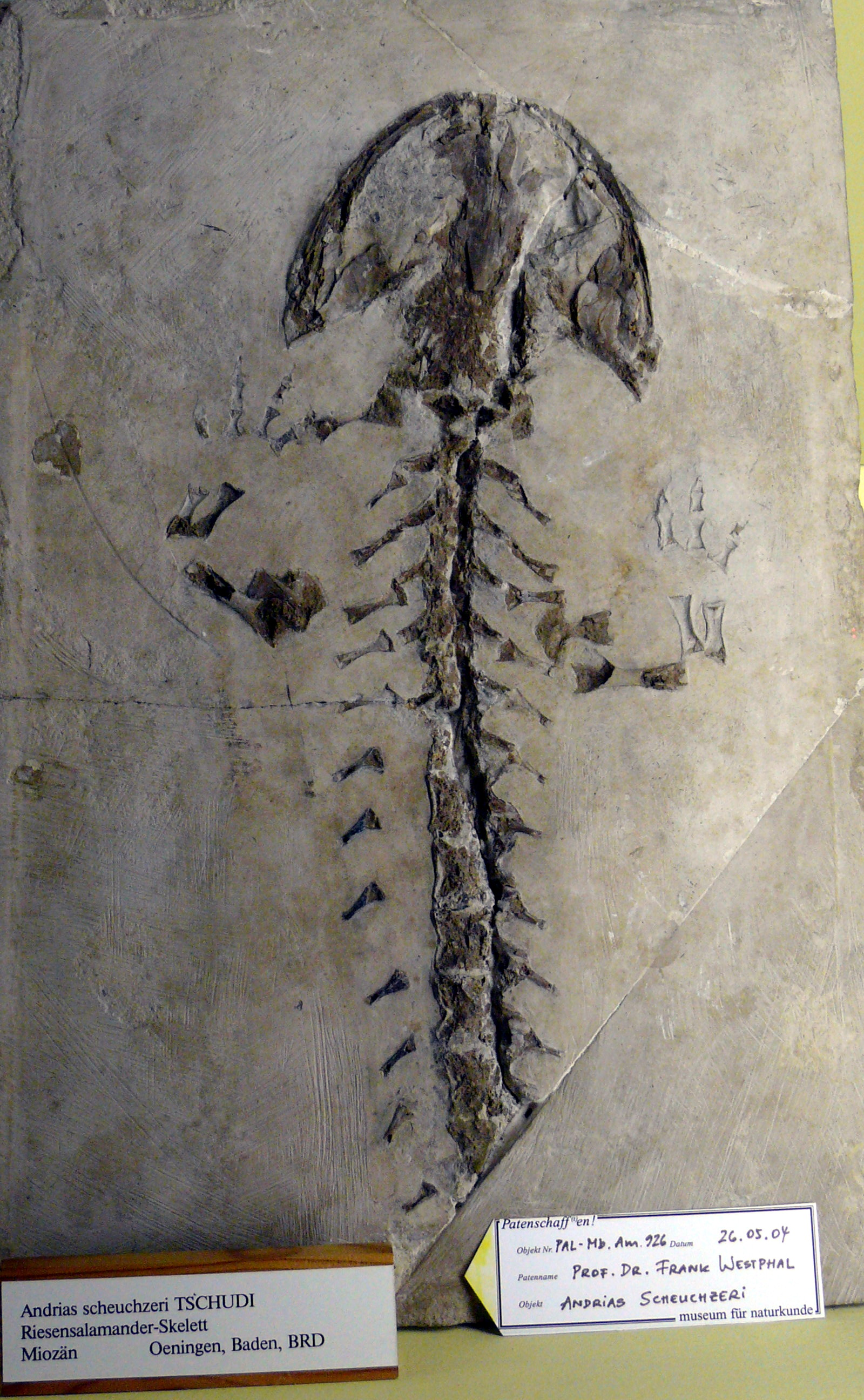
Specimen in Germany

In his book Lithographia Helvetica from 1726, Johann Jakob Scheuchzer described a Miocene fossil found in Öhningen as Homo diluvii testis (Latin: Man, witness of the Deluge), believing it to be the remains of a human that drowned in the biblical Deluge. The fossil was about 1 m (3 ft) long, lacked its tail and hind legs, and could thus be interpreted as showing some resemblance to the remains of a violently trampled human child.

In 1758, the first to doubt his theory in print was Johannes Gessner, who thought it was a giant catfish (Siluris). In 1787 Petrus Camper thought it was a lizard (Lacerta); at that time, scholars and the scientific community generally did not differentiate between reptiles and amphibians. In 1802 Martin van Marum bought this fossil for Teyler's Museum in Haarlem from Scheuchzer's grandson in Zürich, along with a fossilized swordfish, for fourteen Louis d'or. Van Marum agreed it was a catfish. It can still be seen in Teyler's Museum, in the original showcase.

Seven years later, the fossil again came under scrutiny when the famous Georges Cuvier published an article in which he claimed the fossil was "nothing but a salamander, or rather a proteus of gigantic dimensions and of an unknown species". He proceeded to examine the fossil in Haarlem, by then a part of the French Empire, in 1811. By hacking away gently at the fossil, his assistant Charles Léopold Laurillard uncovered the forelimbs and the specimen was recognized for a giant salamander. The difference in color of the stone shows what Scheuchzer saw and what Cuvier later could see.

The specimen was renamed Salamandra scheuchzeri by Friedrich Holl in 1831. The genus Andrias was only coined six years later by Johann Jakob von Tschudi. In doing so, both the genus, Andrias (which means image of man), and the specific name, scheuchzeri, ended up honouring Scheuchzer and his beliefs. The Teylers Museum has several other specimens in their collection in addition to this one.

== Description ==
A number of traits are characteristic of Andrias scheuchzeri, including strongly curved dentaries, the pars facialis of the skull having a rough inner surface with ridges and depressions, and a number of characters relating to the arrangement and shape of the teeth.

== Distribution ==
In Central Europe, fossils are known from the Late Oligocene (Chattian) to Late Pliocene (Piacenzian) of Germany, the Early Miocene of the Czech Republic, the Late Miocene of Austria, and the Middle or Late Miocene of Hungary. Some reports have claimed that Andrias scheuchzeri was distributed as far east as Western Siberia and the Zaissan Basin on the border between China and Kazakhstan. Among the youngest and easternmost remains of Andrias in Europe, which are indeterminate to species, are known from the Northern Caucasus of Russia, dating to the latest Pliocene.

== Ecology ==
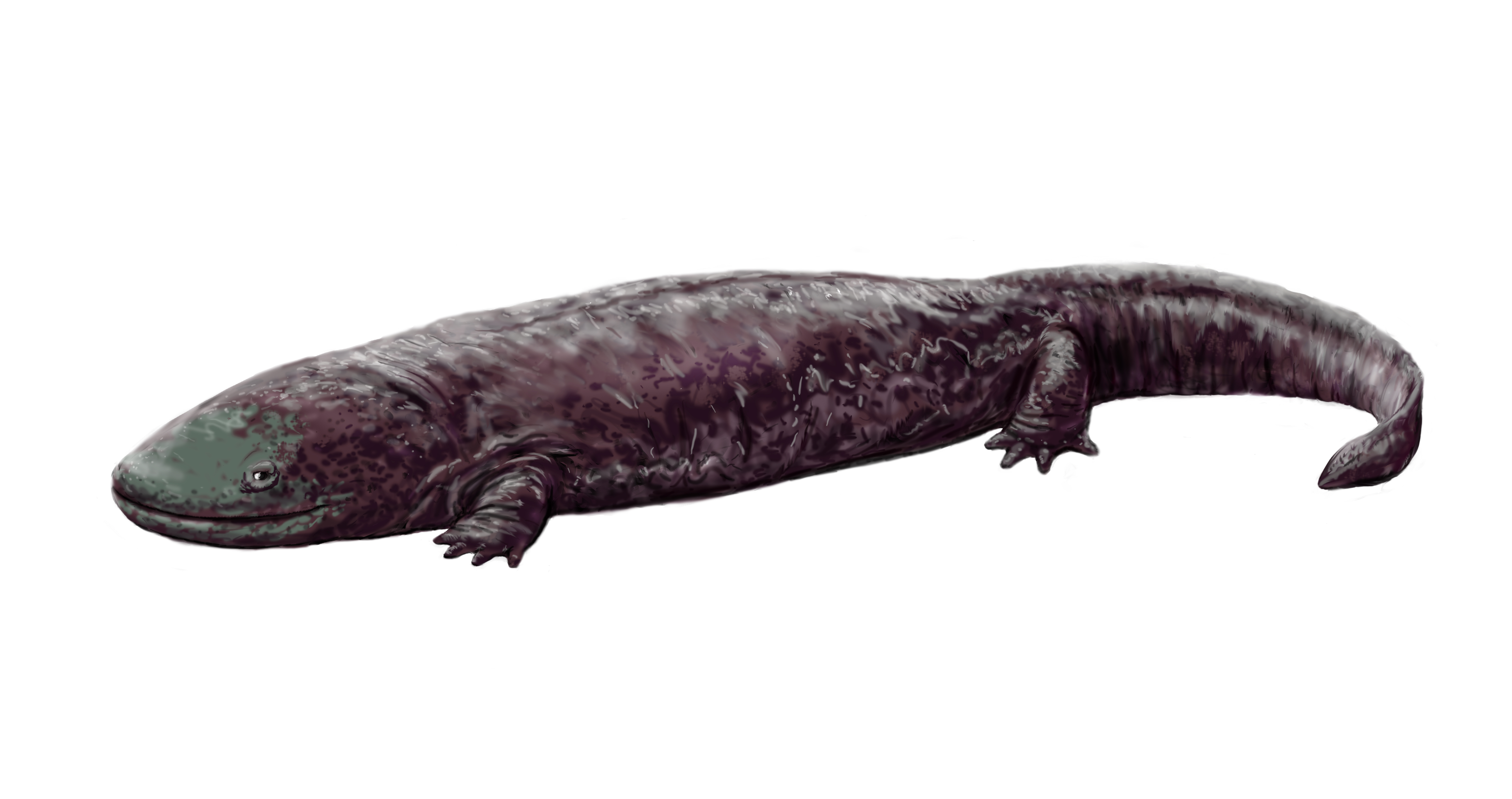
Restoration

Andrias scheuchzeri inhabited ponds, lakes and rivers, unlike modern Asian giant salamanders, which prefer clear, nutrient poor (oligotrophic) rivers and streams.

== In fiction ==
The fictional descendants of Andrias scheuchzeri are the primary antagonists in Karel Čapek's 1936 science fiction novel War with the Newts.

== Bibliography ==
- Richard Ellis (2001), Aquagenesis: The Origin and Evolution of Life in the Sea (London: Penguin).
- Robert Hofrichter (2000), Amphibians: The World of Frogs, Toads, Salamanders and Newts (Toronto: Key Porter Books)
- J. Alan Holman (2006), Fossil Salamanders of North America (Life of the Past) (Bloomington: Indiana University Press)
- J. William Schopf (2001), Cradle of Life: The Discovery of Earth's Earliest Fossils (Princeton: Princeton University Press)
