= PBZ =

PBZ may refer to:

- Pestalozzi-Bibliothek Zürich, a public library in Zurich
- Paclobutrazol, a plant growth regulator and antifungal agent
- People's Bank of Zanzibar, a Tanzanian bank
- Privredna banka Zagreb, a Croatian bank
- Pyribenzamine, a trade name for the drug tripelennamine
- Phenoxybenzamine
- NS PBZ, bank reference given by UK National Savings for Premium Bonds prizes
- Phantom Blade Zero
