= Christian Gottlieb Geissler =

Copperplate engraver, painter and printmaker (1729–1814)

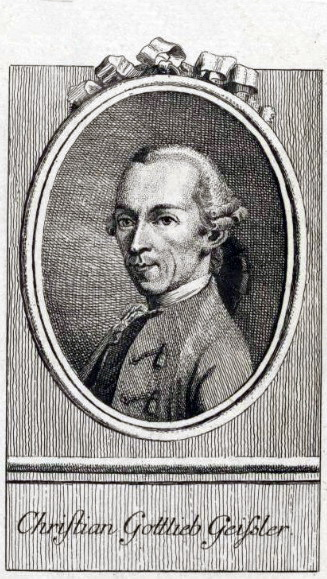

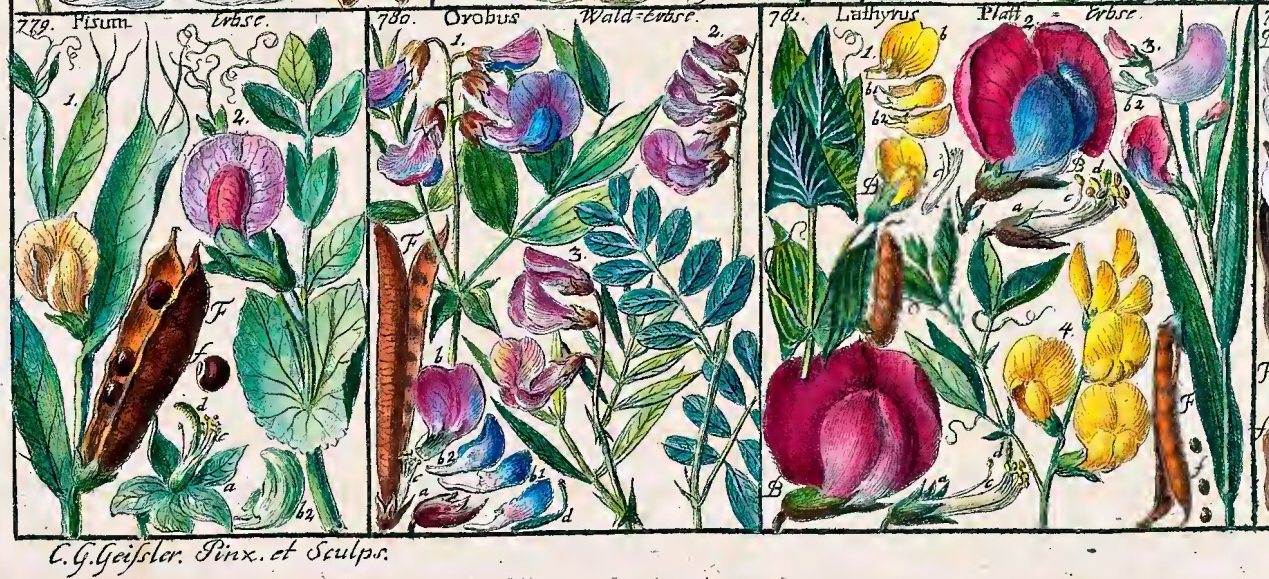
Tabulae Phytographicae (1804)

Christian Gottlieb Geissler (1729 – 2 November 1814) was a German-born copperplate engraver, painter and printmaker in the Republic of Geneva. He specialized in natural history.

== Biography ==
Geissler was born in 1729 in Augsburg. He moved to Geneva in about 1771 where he became a citizen of that Republic. He was the son of Adam Geissler, a garden designer. Geissler is probably best known for his illustrating of Tabulae Phytographicae, an encyclopaedic work published by the Zürich naturalist Johannes Gessner (1709-1790), whose natural history collection Geissler also depicted.

Between 1744 and 1749 Geissler was an apprentice of the Augsburg miniaturist, Samuel Baumeister. He subsequently went to Nuremberg where he helped to illustrate Franz Michael Regenfuss's work Choix de Coquillages et de Crustacés. In 1753 he travelled to Zürich to join Gessner in the production of the 24-part Tabulae Phytographicae, which first appeared in 1795. Following this he moved to Geneva where he worked with the enamel painter Süß, and founded a school of drawing and worked as a copperplate engraver. He died in Geneva on 2 November 1814.
