= Johann Rudolf Rahn (art historian) =

Swiss art historian (1841–1912)

- Rahn around 1886, photograph by Rudolf Ganz
- Born: 24 April 1841; Zurich, Switzerland
- Died: 28 April 1912 (aged 71); Zurich, Switzerland
- Occupation: Art historian
- Spouse: Caroline Meyer von Knonau (m. 1868)
- Parents: Johann Heinrich Rahn (father); Maria Ziegler (mother)
- Relatives: Johann Heinrich Rahn (great-grandfather)

Johann Rudolf Rahn (24 April 1841 – 28 April 1912) was a Swiss art historian, a member of the Rahn family. He was professor of art history at the University of Zurich and from 1882 also at the Polytechnikum in Zurich. He is regarded as the founding figure of monument preservation (Denkmalpflege) and art research in Switzerland, and his Geschichte der bildenden Künste in der Schweiz (1876) was the first standard work on early Swiss art history.

== Biography ==
Johann Rudolf Rahn was born on 24 April 1841 in Zurich, the son of Johann Heinrich Rahn, a Zurich pharmacist, and Maria Rahn, née Ziegler, of Winterthur. He was a great-grandson of Johann Heinrich Rahn. In 1868 he married Caroline Meyer von Knonau, a cousin of his close friend from his student days, Gerold Meyer von Knonau. She was the daughter of Conrad Meyer von Knonau, a Junker and state clerk (Staatsschreiber).

Having lost one parent, Rahn went to live with his grandmother in Winterthur in 1843, and in 1844 with his relatives Margaretha and Johannes Steiger in Herisau. At the age of 14 he returned to Zurich, where the educator and pastor Heinrich Cramer looked after him. His guardian, the lawyer (Fürsprecher) Eduard Meyer, enabled him to obtain the Matura and, from 1860, to study art history at the Polytechnikum (now ETH Zurich) and at the University of Zurich. In 1863–1864 he spent periods of study in Bonn, Berlin and Dresden. Rahn obtained his doctorate in 1866 and his habilitation in 1869. At the University of Zurich he became associate professor in 1870 and full professor of art history in 1878. From 1882 he was also professor of art history at the Polytechnikum in Zurich.

Rahn is regarded as the founding figure of monument preservation (Denkmalpflege) and art research in Switzerland. With his Geschichte der bildenden Künste in der Schweiz von den ältesten Zeiten bis zum Schlusse des Mittelalters ("History of the visual arts in Switzerland from the earliest times to the end of the Middle Ages", 1876) he wrote the first standard work on early Swiss art history. As a scholarly expert, he was involved in the restoration of various buildings, including Wettingen Abbey and Chillon Castle, as well as of various buildings in the Grisons, in Ticino and in Zurich. He also compiled a statistical inventory of Swiss art monuments by canton.

In 1880 Rahn was a co-founder and the vice-president of the Swiss Society for the Preservation of Historical Art Monuments (Schweizerische Gesellschaft zur Erhaltung historischer Kunstdenkmäler). The creation of the Swiss National Museum in Zurich in 1890 was also due in part to his initiative. He was an excellent and extremely productive (architectural) draftsman and left about 5,000 drawings. He died in Zurich on 28 April 1912.

== Bibliography ==
- U. Isler-Hungerbühler, Johann Rudolf Rahn, 1956
- Biografisches Lexikon der Schweizer Kunst, 850–851
- Johann Rudolf Rahn, exhibition catalogue, Mendrisio, 2004
- G. Germann, "Johann Rudolf Rahn und die Ursprünge der Gesellschaft für Schweizerische Kunstgeschichte", in NIKE-Bulletin, 2005, no. 3, 34–39

=== Archives ===
- Zentralbibliothek Zürich, department of prints and drawings (drawings)
