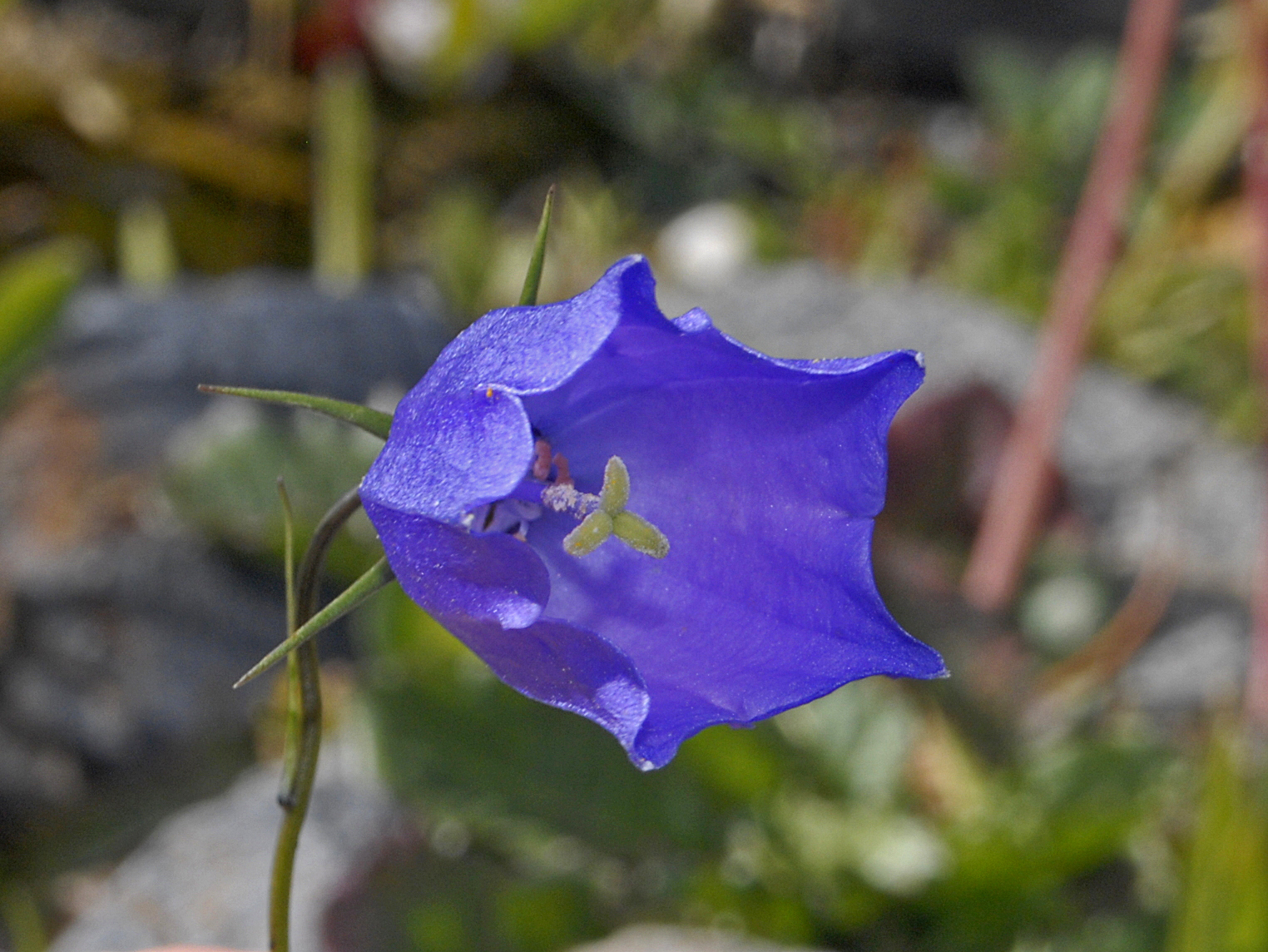
- Campanula scheuchzeri at the Giardino Botanico Alpino Chanousia

Scientific classification
- Kingdom: Plantae
- Clade: Tracheophytes
- Clade: Angiosperms
- Clade: Eudicots
- Clade: Asterids
- Order: Asterales
- Family: Campanulaceae
- Genus: Campanula
- Species: C. scheuchzeri

Binomial name
- Campanula scheuchzeri Domínique Villars, 1779

Synonyms
- Campanula carnica subsp. consanguinea; Campanula consanguinea; Campanula dilecta; Campanula ficarioides subsp. orhyi; Campanula ficarioides var. major; Campanula hegetschweileri; Campanula kerneri; Campanula linifolia; Campanula linifolia f. scheuchzeri; Campanula linifolia var. multiflora

= Campanula scheuchzeri =

Species of flowering plant

Campanula scheuchzeri is a species of bellflower in the family Campanulaceae. The Latin name of the species honors the Swiss botanist Johann Jakob Scheuchzer (1672–1733).

== Description ==
Campanula scheuchzeri can reach a height of 10–30 centimetres (3.9–11.8 in). It forms solitary blue or purple campanulate flowers. They bloom from July to August.

== Distribution ==
This species is native to Iberian Peninsula, France, the Apennine and the Balkan Peninsula, Central Europe and Romania.

== Habitat ==
It can be found in mountain regions at an elevation 1,300–2,600 metres (4,300–8,500 ft) above sea level.
