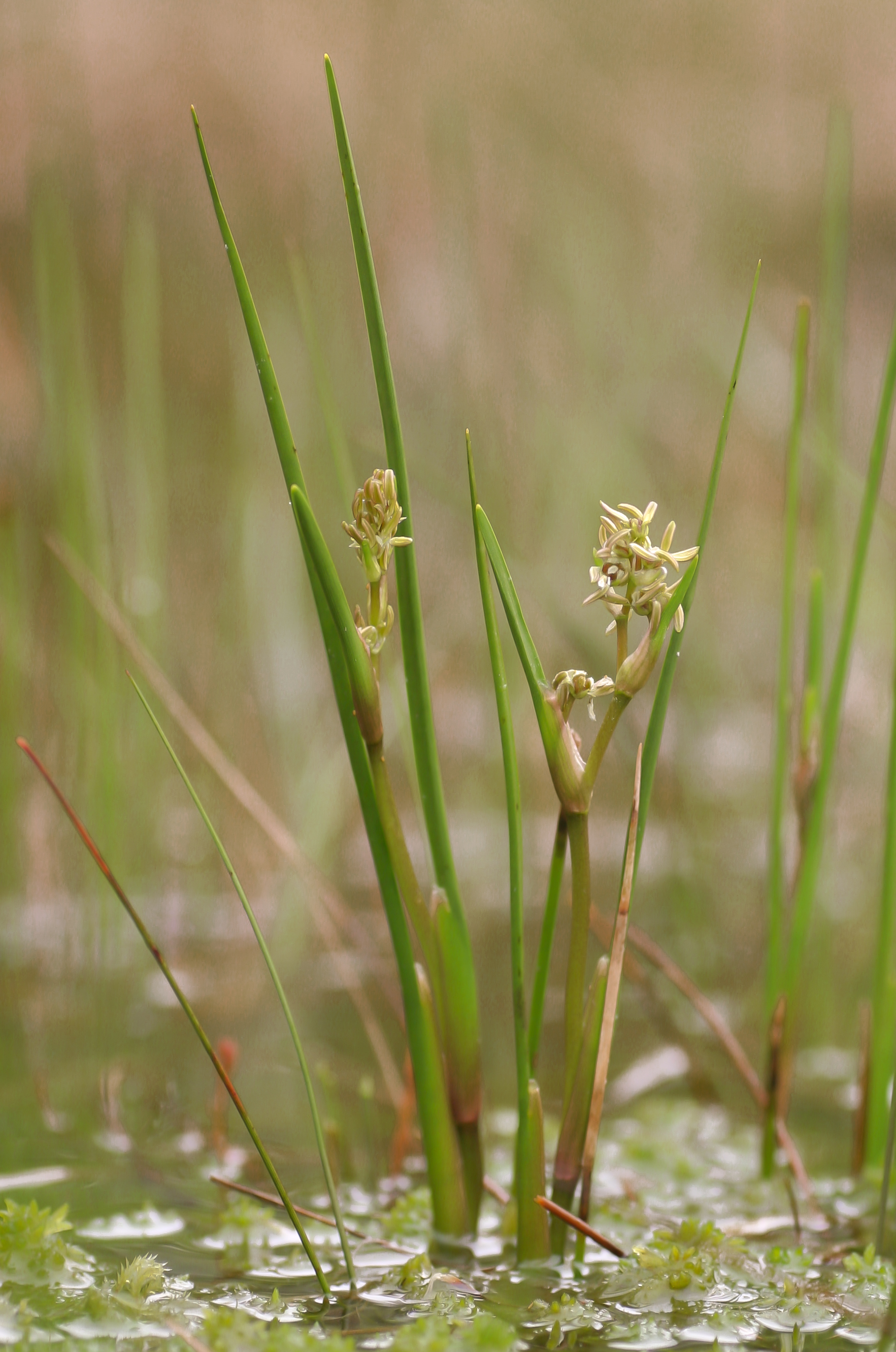
- Scheuchzeria palustris - flowering

Scientific classification
- Kingdom: Plantae
- Clade: Tracheophytes
- Clade: Angiosperms
- Clade: Monocots
- Order: Alismatales
- Family: Scheuchzeriaceae; F.Rudolphi
- Genus: Scheuchzeria; L.
- Species: S. palustris

Binomial name
- Scheuchzeria palustris L.

Synonyms
- Papillaria Dulac, nom. illeg.; Telmatophila Ehrh.; Papillaria palustris (L.) Dulac; Scheuchzeria americana (Fernald) G.N.Jones; Scheuchzeria asiatica Miq.; Scheuchzeria generalis E.H.L.Krause; Scheuchzeria palustris var. americana Fernald; Scheuchzeria palustris subsp. americana (Fernald) Hultén; Scheuchzeria paniculata Gilib., opus utique oppr.

= Scheuchzeria =

Genus of flowering plants

Scheuchzeria palustris (Rannoch-rush, or pod grass), is a flowering plant in the family Scheuchzeriaceae, in which there is only one species and Scheuchzeria is the only genus. In the APG II system it is placed in the order Alismatales of the monocots.

== Description ==
It is a herbaceous perennial plant, native to cool temperate regions of the Northern Hemisphere, where it grows in wet Sphagnum peat bogs. It grows to 10–40 cm tall, with narrow linear leaves alternating up the stem, with a basal sheath. The leaves can be up to 20 cm. The leaf tips are blunt with a conspicuous pore.

It has a creeping rhizome clothed in papery, straw coloured remains of old leaf bases.

The flowers are greenish-yellow, 4–6 mm diameter, with six tepals. They have an inflated sheathing base, 6 stamens and 3 carpels. It flowers from June until August

There are two subspecies, not considered distinct by all authorities:

- Scheuchzeria palustris subsp. palustris. Northern and eastern Europe, northern Asia.
- Scheuchzeria palustris subsp. americana (Fernald) Hultén. Northern North America.

== Etymology ==
The genus is named after Johann Jakob Scheuchzer, a Swiss naturalist, and his brother, Johann Gaspar Scheuchzer. The species name is from the Latin for a swamp.

The English name refers to its occurrence on Rannoch Moor in central Scotland, the first site in Great Britain the species was known from, and only one where it currently occurs; it is extinct at a few other wetland sites further south in Britain, being found in pools and wet hollows of ancient undisturbed Sphagnum bogs.

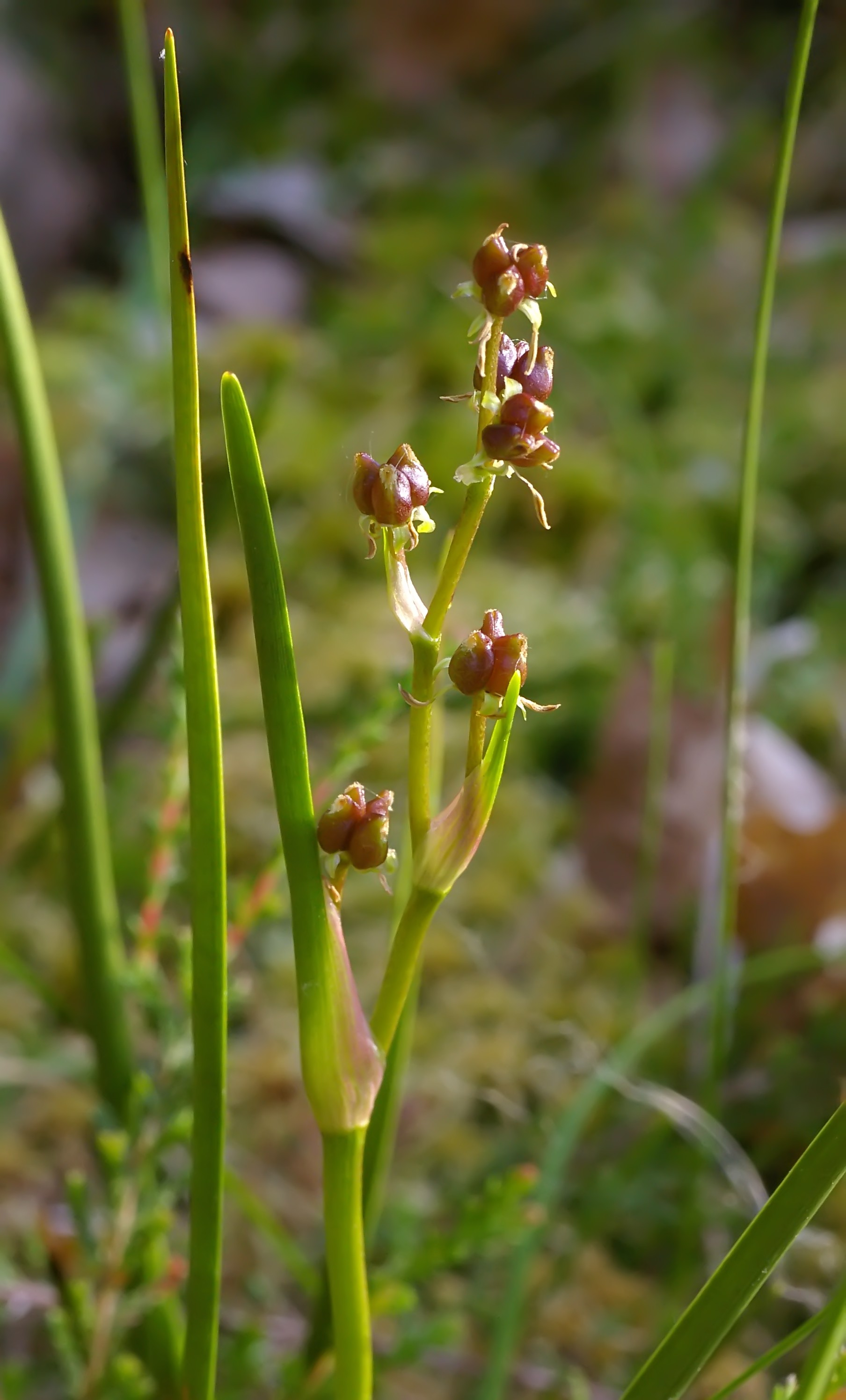
Flowering plant

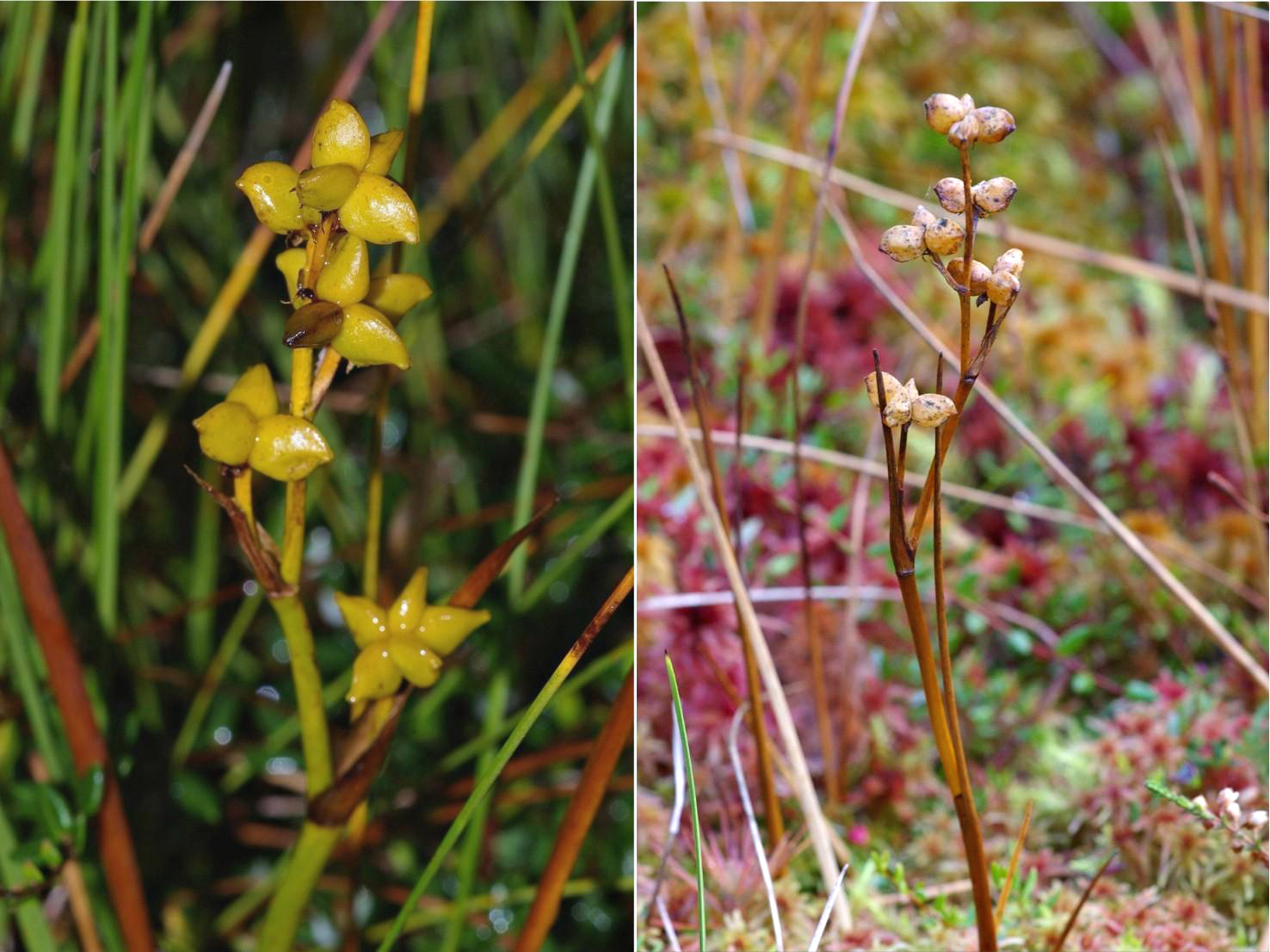
Stem with seeds, left; winter stem, right

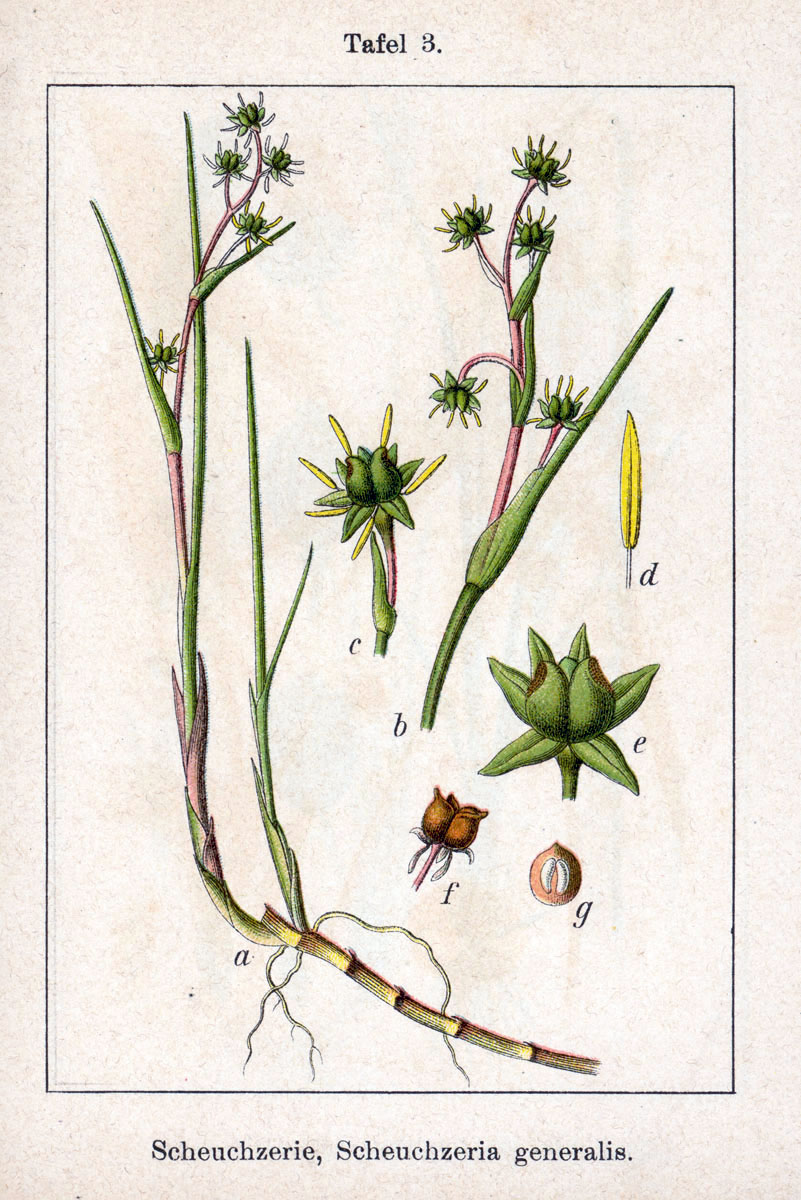
1796 illustration
