= Pestalozzi-Bibliothek Zürich =

Public library system in Zürich, Switzerland

- Location: City of Zürich, Canton of Zürich, Switzerland
- Type: Public library

Other information
- Website: www.pbz.ch

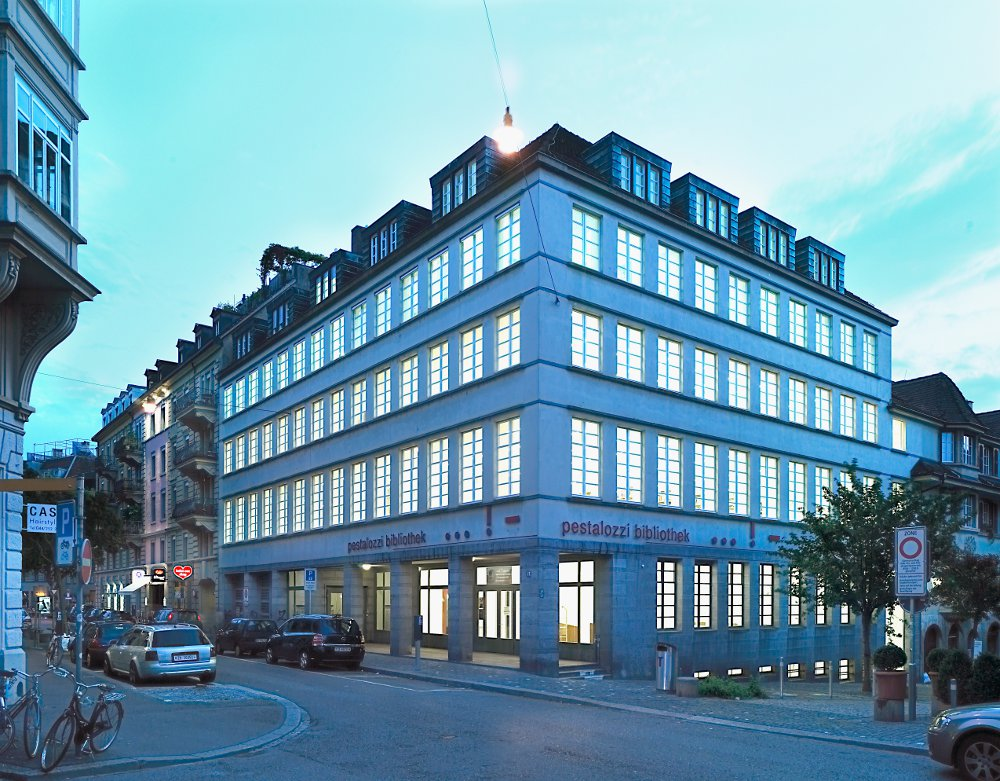
PBZ Altstadt, the largest of the 14 branches in the city

The Pestalozzi-Bibliothek Zürich (PBZ) is the public library of the City of Zürich, Switzerland. It operates a total of 14 branches. The PBZ financed primarily through contributions from the city government, with a small contribution from the cantonal government.

The library traces its founding to 1896 with the Pestalozzi Society, named for the educator born in Zürich and advancing his ideals. As of 2020, the PBZ system attracts about one million visits annually.

== See also ==
- Zentralbibliothek Zürich: a dual-purpose university and public library also in Zürich
