= Johann Caspar Scheuchzer =

Swiss naturalist and physician

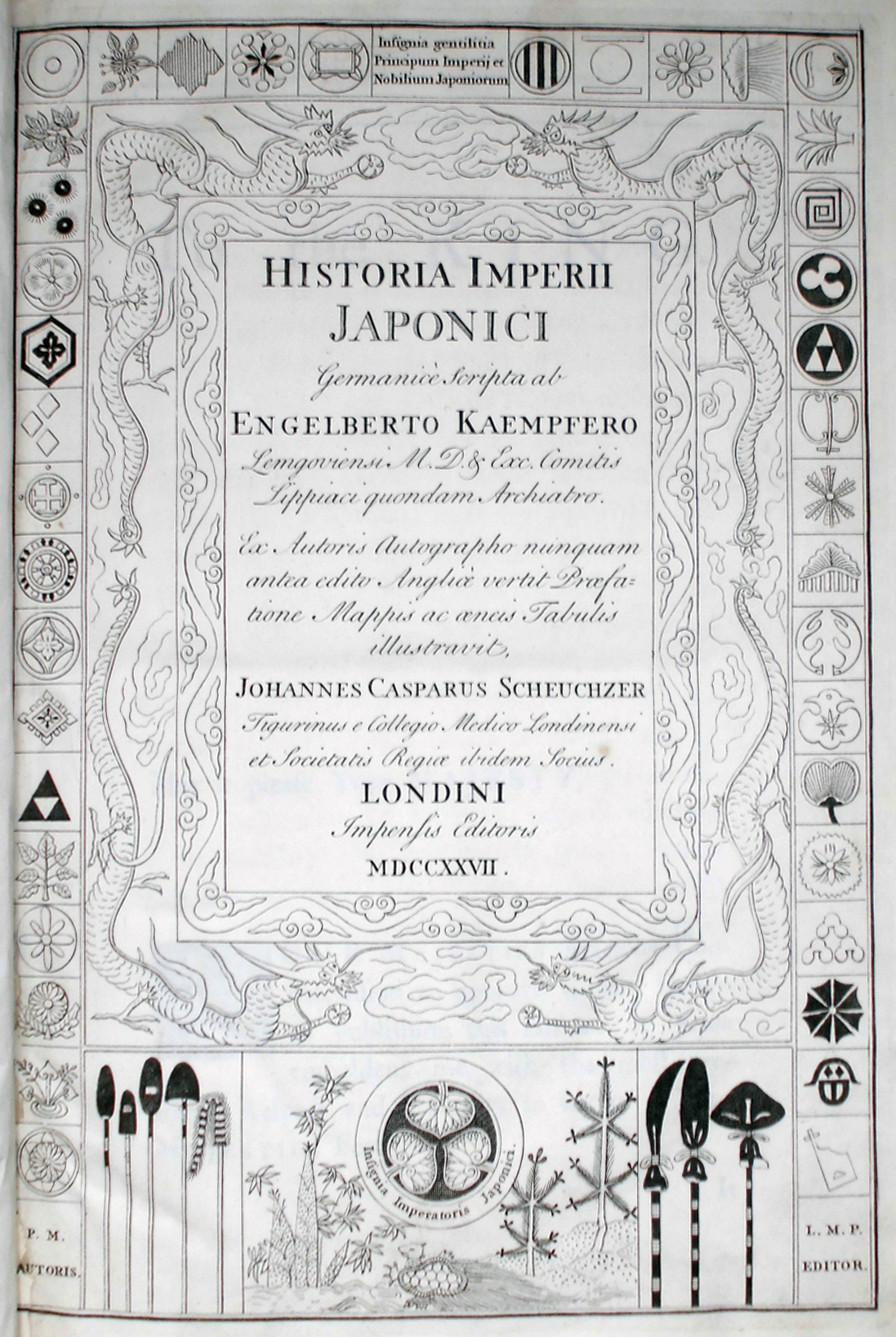
Frontispiece of History of Japan, translated by Scheuchzer, 1727

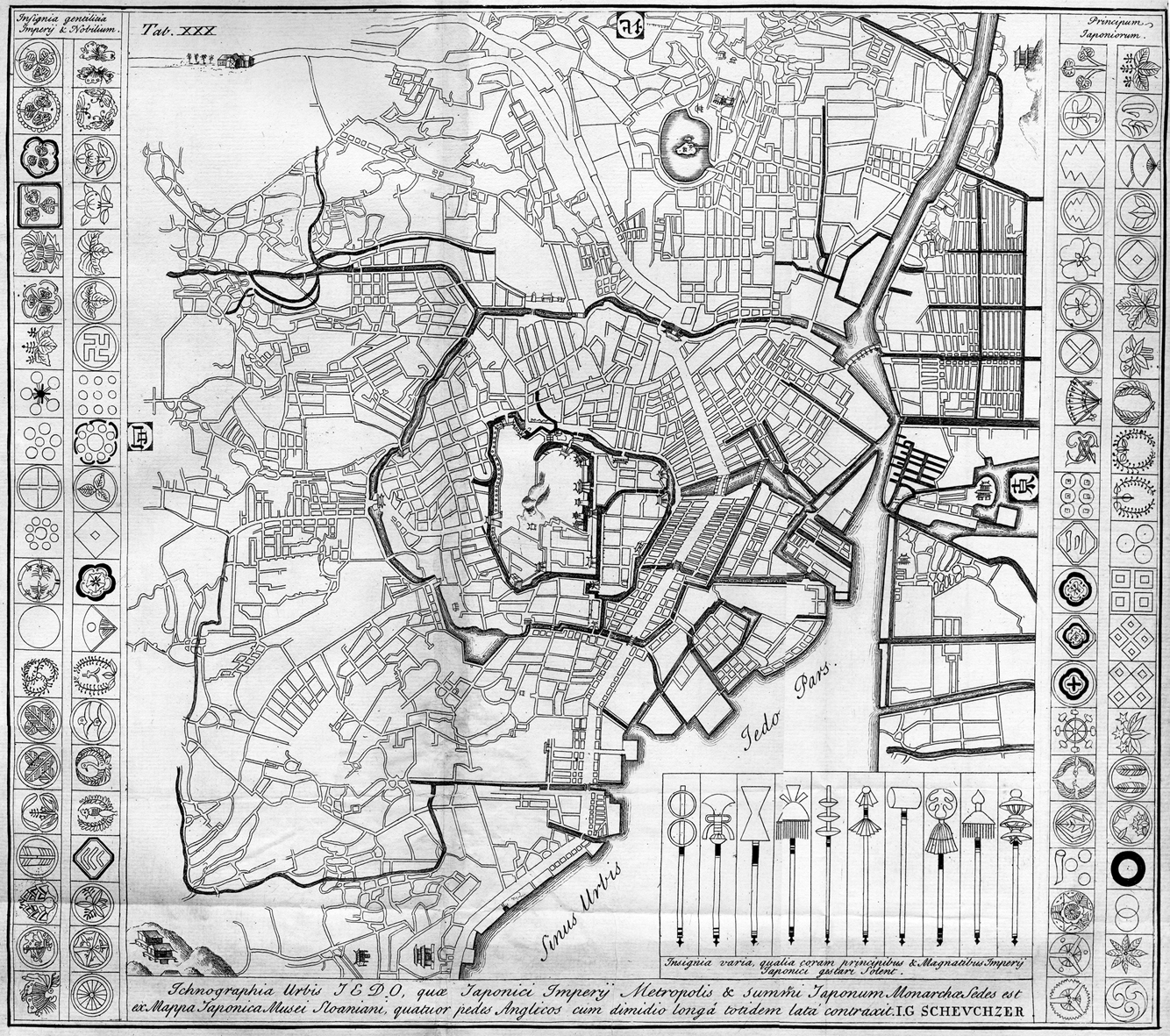
The first map of Edo produced in Europe – Scheuchzer based it on a Japanese woodblock print. History of Japan, 1727, Tab XXX

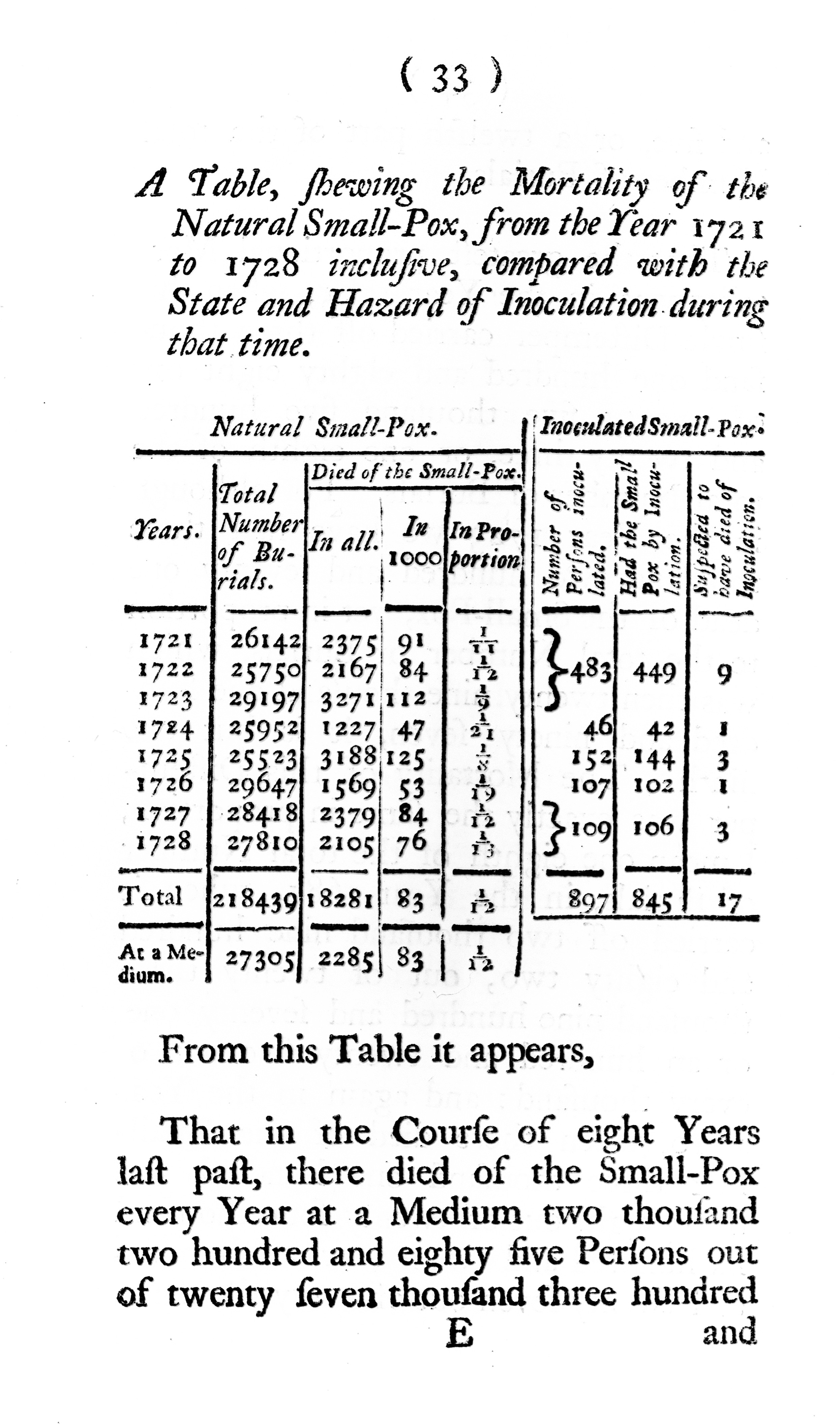
A mortality table from Scheuchzer's An account of the success of inoculating the small-pox in Great Britain, for the years 1727 and 1728 (1729)

Johann Caspar Scheuchzer (26 January 1702 – 21 April 1729; also known as Hans Kaspar and Jean Gaspard) was a Swiss naturalist, physician and writer on the history and culture of Japan

== Life ==
Scheuchzer was born in Zürich. The third child of the Zürich scholar Johann Jakob Scheuchzer (1672–1733) and his wife Susanna, he grew up in a stimulating environment. His father worked as a physicist, psychiatrist, psychiatrist, naturalist and a writer on the Alps. Scheuchzer translated and edited the manuscript "Today's Japan" by Engelbert Kaempfer, which had been acquired by Hans Sloane with the rest of Kaempfer's collection – this translation was published in two folio volumes in 1727, with a title page reading:

The History of Japan: giving an account of the ancient and present state and government of that empire; of its temples, palaces, castles and other buildings; Of Its Metals, Minerals, Trees, Plants, Animals, Birds and Fishes; Of The Chronology and Succession of the Emperors, Ecclesiastical and Secular; Of The Original Descent, Religions, Customs, and Manufactures of the Natives, and of their Trade and Commerce with the Dutch and Chinese. Together with a Description of the Kingdom of Siam. Written in High-Dutch by Engelbertus Kaempfer, M.D. Physician to the Dutch Embassy to the Emperor’s Court; and translated from his Original Manuscript, never before printed, by J. G. Scheuchzer, F.R.S. and a Member of the College of Physicians, London. With the Life of the Author, and an Introduction. Illustrated with many Copper Plates. London: Printed for the Translator, MDCCXXVII.

This work may have exacerbated Scheuchzer's illness and his exact cause of death is unknown. He died in spring 1729 in Sloane's house in London and was buried on 24 April in the churchyard of Chelsea Old Church.

== Works ==
- Theses de diluvio publico & placido eruditorum examini subjicient Præses Johannes Jacobus Scheuchzerus Med. Doct. Math. Prof. [...] atque Joh. Casparus Scheuchzerus, J.J.F. [...] author et respondens. MDCCXXII [...] Tiguri, Ex Typographeo Bodmeriano.
- John Gasper Scheuchzer: An account of the success of inoculating the small-pox in Great Britain, for the years 1727 and 1728. With a comparison between the mortality of the natural small-pox, and the miscarriages in that practice; as also some general remarks onits progress and success, since its first introduction. To which are subjoined, I. An account of the success of inoculation in foreign parts. II. A relation of the like method of giving the small-pox, as it is practised in the kingdoms of Tunis, Tripoli, and Algier. London, J. Peele, 1729.

== Bibliography ==
- B. M. Bodart-Bailey: Kaempfer Restor’d. In: Monumenta Nipponica, 43, 1, 1988, S. 1–33
- Andrea Rusnock, ‘Scheuchzer, John Gaspar (1702–1729)’ – Oxford Dictionary of National Biography (subscription required)
- (in German) W. Michel: Johann Caspar Scheuchzer (1702–1729) und die Herausgabe der History of Japan. In: Asiatische Studien/Études Asiatiques, 64, 1, 2010 Zurich Open Repository and Archive ZORA S. 101–137
