= Johann Gaspar Scheuchzer =

Swiss botanist (1684–1738)

Johannes Scheuchzer

Johannes Gaspar Scheuchzer (1684 – 1738) was a Swiss botanist and plant collector. He was the brother of Swiss scholar Johann Jakob Scheuchzer, both of whom are the namesake of the genus Scheuchzeria.
