= Johann Rudolf Rahn (died 1786) =

Swiss theologian (1742–1786)

- Baptised: 29 November 1742; Zurich, Old Swiss Confederacy
- Died: 1786; Zurich, Old Swiss Confederacy
- Occupations: Theologian; professor; translator
- Spouse: Anna Kleophea Heidegger (m. 1769)
- Parents: Johann Rudolf Rahn (father); Anna Katharina Hess (mother)
- Relatives: Johann Heinrich Rahn (brother)

Johann Rudolf Rahn (baptized 29 November 1742 – 1786) was a Swiss theologian from Zurich, a member of the Rahn family. From 1769 he was professor of ethics at the Carolinum in Zurich, later also of church history and natural law. He translated religious literature from English into German.

== Biography ==
Johann Rudolf Rahn was baptized on 29 November 1742 in Zurich, the son of Johann Rudolf Rahn, an archdeacon and canon (Chorherr), and Anna Katharina Hess. His brother was the physician Johann Heinrich Rahn. In 1769 he married Anna Kleophea Heidegger, daughter of Salomon Heidegger, a merchant.

Rahn studied theology in Zurich and was ordained in 1763. He then continued his studies in Berlin. In 1769 he became professor of ethics at the Carolinum in Zurich, and later also of church history (1773) and natural law (1776).

Rahn translated religious literature from English into German, including works by William Craig, John Lawson and Nathaniel Spinckes. He died in Zurich in 1786.

== Bibliography ==
- W. Schnyder-Spross, Die Familie Rahn von Zürich, 1951, 417
