= Johann Heinrich Rahn (physician) =

Swiss physician (1749–1812)

- Line engraving by Johann Heinrich Lips
- Born: 23 October 1749; Zurich, Old Swiss Confederacy
- Died: 3 August 1812 (aged 62); Zurich, Switzerland
- Occupation: Physician
- Spouse: Anna Barbara von Orelli
- Parents: Johann Rudolf Rahn (father); Anna Katharina Hess (mother)
- Relatives: Johann Rudolf Rahn (brother); Johann Rudolf Rahn (great-grandson)

Johann Heinrich Rahn (23 October 1749 – 3 August 1812) was a Swiss physician from Zurich, a member of the Rahn family. In 1782 he founded the medical-surgical institute in Zurich, and in 1784 he became a canon and teacher of physics and mathematics at the Carolinum. He was a senator of the Helvetic Republic from 1798 to 1800 and the founding president of two medical societies.

== Biography ==
Johann Heinrich Rahn was born on 23 October 1749 in Zurich, the son of Johann Rudolf Rahn, an archdeacon and canon (Chorherr), and Anna Katharina Hess. His brother was Johann Rudolf Rahn. He married Anna Barbara von Orelli, daughter of Felix von Orelli, a professor of theology. His great-grandson was the art historian Johann Rudolf Rahn.

In 1771 Rahn obtained his doctorate in medicine in Göttingen, and he practiced as a physician in Zurich. In 1782 he founded the medical-surgical institute (Medizinisch-chirurgisches Institut), which became a cantonal institute in 1804. In 1784 he attached to it a seminar with a hospital (Krankenanstalt). In the same year he became a canon (Chorherr) and teacher of physics and mathematics at the Carolinum.

From 1798 to 1800 Rahn was a senator of the Helvetic Republic. In 1788 he was the founding president of the Helvetic Society of Corresponding Physicians and Surgeons (Helvetische Gesellschaft correspondierender Ärzte und Wundärzte), in 1803 president of the Naturforschende Gesellschaft in Zürich, and in 1810 the founding president of the medical-surgical cantonal society (Medizinisch-chirurgische Kantonalgesellschaft), today the medical society of the canton of Zurich (Ärztegesellschaft des Kantons Zürich). In 1792 he received the dignity of count palatine (Diploma comitis palatini). He died in Zurich on 3 August 1812.

== Bibliography ==
- W. Schnyder-Spross, Die Familie Rahn von Zürich, 1951
- U. von Schulthess, Medicin-Doctor und Chorherr Johann Heinrich Rahn, 1749–1812, 1959
- M. Leisibach, Das Medizinisch-chirurgische Institut in Zürich, 1782–1833, 1982
- Brigitte Ruckstuhl and Elisabeth Ryter, Von der Seuchenpolizei zu Public Health. Öffentliche Gesundheit in der Schweiz seit 1750, 2017

=== Archives ===
- Zentralbibliothek Zürich, manuscripts department, papers (Nachlass)
