= Scheuchzerhorn =

Mountain in Switzerland

- Location within Switzerland

Highest point
- Elevation: 3,455 m (11,335 ft)
- Prominence: 113 m (371 ft)
- Parent peak: Finsteraarhorn
- Coordinates: 46°32′37.7″N 8°11′24.2″E

Geography
- Location: Bern, Switzerland
- Parent range: Bernese Alps

The Scheuchzerhorn is a mountain of the Bernese Alps, located west of the Grimsel Pass in the canton of Bern. It lies north-east of the Oberaarhorn, on the range separating the valley of the Unteraar Glacier from the valley of the Oberaar Glacier.

The mountain was named in honor of the Swiss naturalist Johann Jakob Scheuchzer.

== See also ==
- List of mountains of Switzerland named after people
