= Gottlieb Sigmund Gruner =

Gottlieb Sigmund Gruner (1717–1778), cartographer and geologist, was the author of the first connected attempt to describe in detail the snowy mountains of Switzerland.

His father, Johann Rudolf Gruner (1680–1761), was pastor of Trachselwald, in the Bernese Emmenthal (1705), and later (1725) of Burgdorf, and a great collector of information relating to historical and scientific matters; his great Thesaurus topographico-historicus totius ditionis Bernensis (4 vols, folio, 1729–1730) still remains in manuscript, but in 1732 he published a small work entitled Deliciae urbis Bernae, while he possessed an extensive cabinet of natural history objects.

Naturally such tastes had a great influence on the mind of his son, who was born at Trachselwald, and educated by his father and at the Latin school at Burgdorf, not going to Bern much before 1736, when he published a dissertation on the use of fire by the heathen. In 1739 he qualified as a notary, in 1741 became the archivist of Hesse-Homburg, and in 1743 accompanied Prince Christian of Anhalt-Schaumburg to Silesia and the university of Halle.

He returned to his native land before 1749, when he obtained a post at Thorberg, being transferred in 1764 to Landshut and Fraubrunnen. It was in 1760 that he published in 3 vols. at Bern his chief work, Die Eisgebirge des Schweizerlandes (bad French translation by M. de Kéralio, Paris, 1770). The first two volumes are filled by a detailed description of the snowy Swiss mountains, based not so much on personal experience as on older works, and a very large number of communications received by Gruner from numerous friends; the third volume deals with glaciers in general, and their various properties.

Though in many respects imperfect, Gruner's book sums up all that was known on the subject in his day, and forms the starting-point for later writers. The illustrations are very curious and interesting. In 1778 he republished (nominally in London, really at Bern) much of the information contained in his larger work, but thrown into the form of letters, supposed to be written in 1776 from various spots, under the title of Reisen dunch die merkwurdigsten Gegenden Helvetiens (2 vols).
