= Johann Jakob Scheuchzer =

Swiss paleontologist (1672–1733)

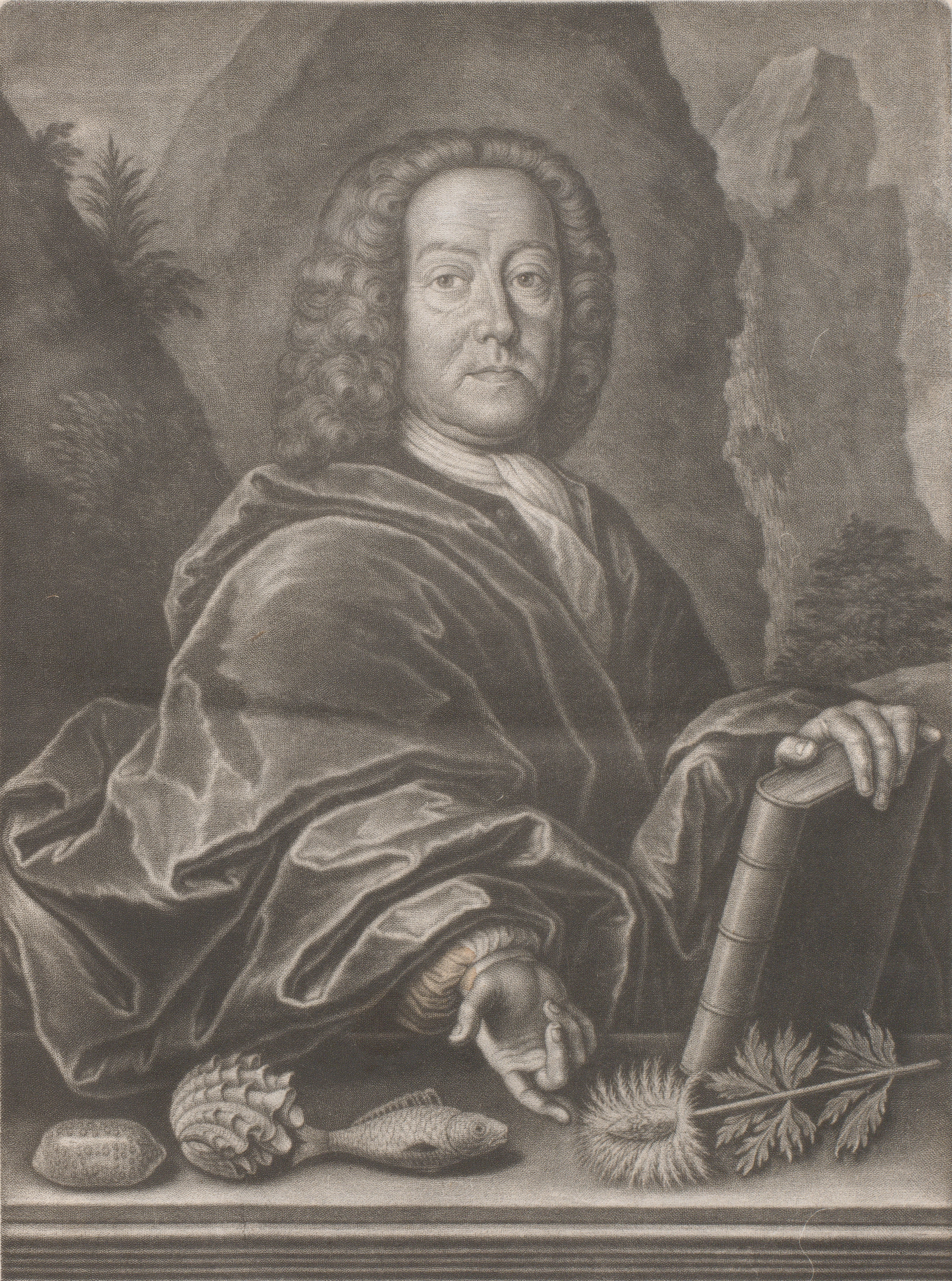
- J. J. Scheuchzer in 1731, aged 59
- Born: 2 August 1672; Zürich, Swiss Confederacy
- Died: 23 June 1733 (aged 60); Zürich, Swiss Confederacy
- Education: University of Altdorf; Utrecht University
- Occupations: Physician; Natural scientist; Paleontologist
- Known for: Physica sacra; Fossil studies; Alpine exploration
- Spouse: Susanna Vogel
- Children: Nine (?), but few of them survived to adulthood

Johann Jakob Scheuchzer (2 August 1672 – 23 June 1733) was a Swiss physician and natural scientist born in Zürich. His most famous work was the Physica sacra in four volumes, a commentary on the Bible that presented his view of the world as a convergence of science and religion. It was richly illustrated with copperplate etchings and came to be called the Kupfer-Bibel or "Copper Bible".

Scheuchzer supported Biblical creation, but his support for Copernican heliocentrism forced him to print his works outside Switzerland. He also supported antecedent concepts of Neptunism and considered fossils as evidence for the Biblical deluge. A fossil from Ohningen that he identified as a human drowned by the Flood was later shown to be a Miocene salamander, which was named after him as Andrias scheuchzeri.

== Life and career ==
The son of the namesake senior town physician (Archiater) of Zürich and Barbara Fäsi, daughter of the principal of the Latin school, he received his education in Zürich and, in 1692, went to the University of Altdorf near Nuremberg, being intended for the medical profession. Early in 1694, he took his degree of Doctor of Medicine at the University of Utrecht, and then returned to Altdorf bei Nürnberg to complete his mathematical studies. He studied astronomy under Georg Eimmart. He returned to Zürich in 1696 (following the death of the town physician, Johann Jakob Wagner, in 1695). He was made junior town physician (Poliater) with the promise of the professorship of mathematics, which he duly obtained in 1710.

From 1697, he was a secretary at the Collegium der Wohlgesinnten, where he gave lectures on philosophy. He also worked as a curator of the Kunstkammer (natural history cabinet) of the city of Zürich. He corresponded widely with other scholars and published in the transactions of the Royal Society, where he was elected a Fellow on 30 November 1703, seconded by John Woodward (1665–1728), with whom he shared Neptunist-like views.

He married Susanna Vogel, and they had nine children, but only a few lived to adulthood. He was promoted to the chair of physics and to the office of senior city physician (Stadtarzt), in January 1733, only a few months before his death. He died on 23 June 1733 in Zürich.

One of Johann Jakob Scheuchzer's sons, Johann Caspar (1702–1729), became a natural scientist, doctor, and translator. Johannes Scheuchzer (1684–1738), a doctor and botanist, was Johann Jakob's younger brother.

== Published works ==
Scheuchzer wrote extensively for Nova literaria Helvetica, the Philosophical Transactions of the Royal Society, and started his own periodicals, Beschreibung der Natur-Geschichten des Schweizerlands and Historischer und politischer Mercurius. He also published works (apart from numerous articles), estimated at 34. He corresponded extensively across Europe with nearly 800 correspondents. These included the theologian Hortensia von Moos, and his many students, such as Antonio Picenino (and his father Giacomo Picenino), with whom he went on alpine excursions. His historical writings are mostly still in manuscript. The more important of his published writings relate either to his scientific observations (across all branches) or to his journeys, during which he collected materials for these scientific works.

=== Scientific works ===
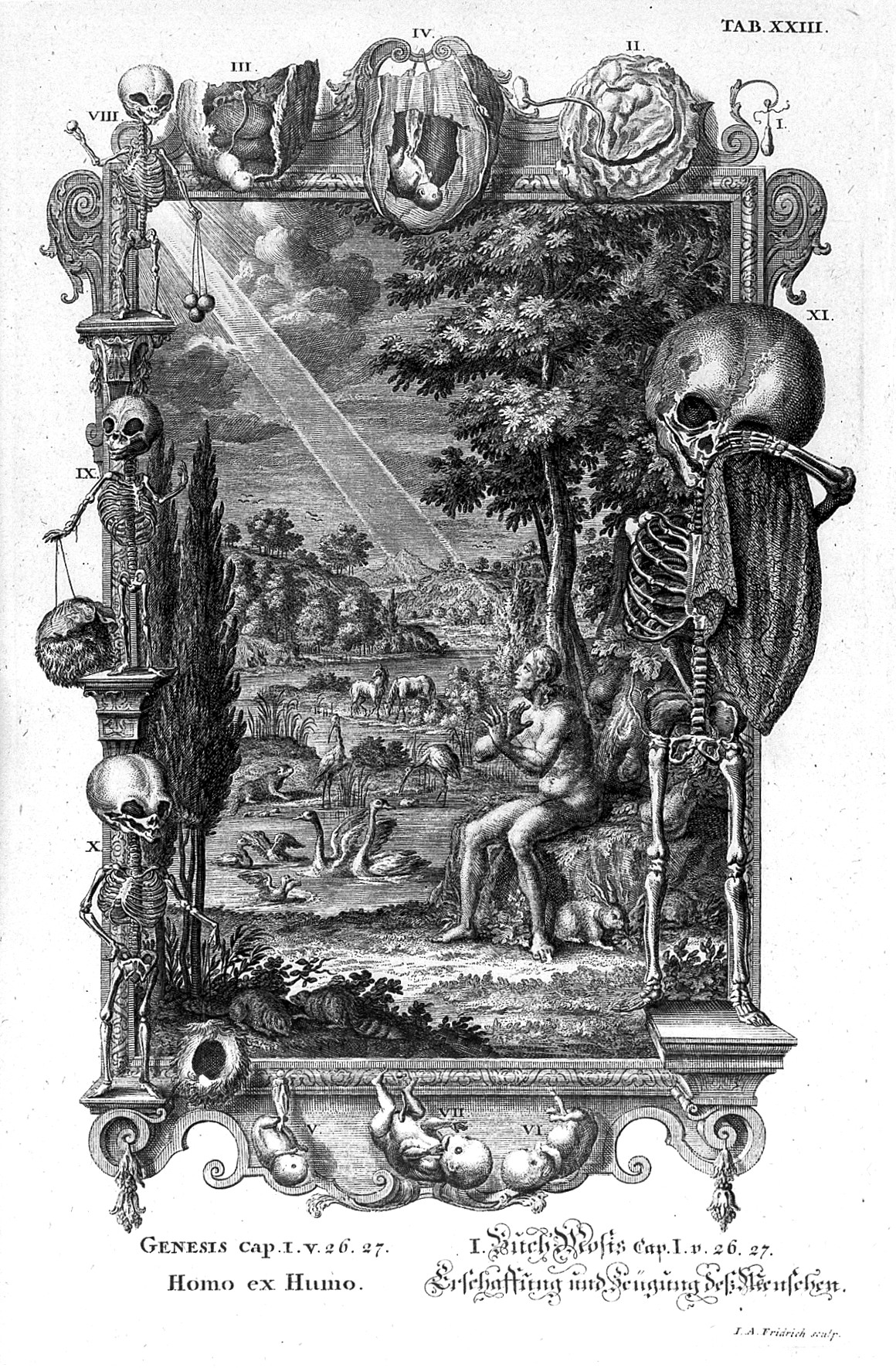
Physica sacra: The creation of man – and an individual's development, from fertilization to death

In the former category is his self-published Beschreibung der Naturgeschichte des Schweitzerlandes (3 volumes, Zürich, 1706–1708), the third volume containing an account in German of his journey of 1705; a new edition of this book and, with important omissions, of his 1723 work, was issued, in 2 volumes, in 1746, by JG Sulzer, under the title of Naturgeschichte des Schweitzerlandes sammt seinen Reisen über die schweitzerischen Gebirge, and his Helvetiae historia naturalis oder Naturhistorie des Schweitzerlandes (published in 3 volumes, at Zürich, 1716–1718, and reissued in the same form in 1752, under the German title just given). The first of the three parts of the last-named work deals with the Swiss mountains (summing up all that was then known about them, and serving as a link between Simmler's work of 1574 and Gruner's of 1760), the second with the Swiss rivers, lakes and mineral baths, and the third with Swiss meteorology and geology.

In his Physica sacra he included arguments for the existence of God, suggesting that an atheist should be shown a pin-hole camera and then shown how the eye is a perfect replica of the same, as proof of intelligent design. He also followed the contemporary tradition of interpreting fossil ammonites as evidence of the Biblical deluge. Additionally, he described fossil plants in his Herbarium diluvianum (1709). He observed the solar eclipse of 1706 and the lunar eclipse of the same year, in which he recorded a Perseid meteor shower.

Scheuchzer's works, as issued in 1746 and in 1752, formed (with Tschudi's Chronicum Helveticum) one of the chief sources for Schiller's drama Wilhelm Tell (1804). He published many scientific notes and papers in the Philosophical Transactions for 1706–07, 1709, and 1727–28.

=== Travel works ===
In the second category are his Itinera alpina tria (made in 1702–04), which was published in London in 1708, and dedicated to the Royal Society, while the plates illustrating it were executed at the expense of various fellows of the society, including the president, Sir Isaac Newton (whose imprimatur appears on the title-page), Sir Hans Sloane, Dean Aldrich, Humfrey Wanley, etc. The text is written in Latin, as is that of the definitive work describing his travels (with which is incorporated the 1708 volume) that appeared in 1723 at Leiden, in four quarto volumes, under the title of Itinera per Helvetiae alpinas regiones facta annis 1702–11. He also wrote Helvetiae stoicheiographia (1716–1718) based on his annual Alpine travels.

These journeys led Scheuchzer to almost every part of Switzerland, particularly its central and eastern districts. Apropos of his visit (1705) to the Rhône Glacier, he inserts a full account of the other Swiss glaciers, as far as they were then known, while in 1706, after mentioning certain wonders to be seen in the museum at Lucerne, he adds reports by men of good faith who had seen dragons in Switzerland. He doubts their existence, but illustrates the reports by fanciful representations of dragons, which have led some modern writers to depreciate his merits as a traveller and naturalist, for the belief in dragons was then widely spread.

In 1712, he published a map of Switzerland in four sheets (scale 1/290,000), of which the eastern portion (based on his personal observations) is by far the most accurate, though the map as a whole was the best map of Switzerland until the end of the 18th century. At the end of his 1723 book, he gives a full list (covering 27 quarto pages) of his writings from 1694 to 1721.

Scheuchzer is also known for his paleontological work. He discovered and donated to museums the fossilised fishes from the slates of the Matt Formation in Glarus, which were among the earliest fossil fishes in Europe to be scientifically documented. These fossil fish became the target of a thriving fossil trade shortly after their public announcement. In his Lithographia Helvetica, he described fossils as "plays of nature" or alternately as leftovers from the biblical Flood. Most famously, he claimed that a fossilised skeleton found in a Baden quarry was the remains of a human who had perished in the deluge. This claim, which seemed to verify Christian scripture, was accepted for several decades after Scheuchzer's death, until 1811, when French naturalist Georges Cuvier re-examined the specimen and showed that it was actually a large prehistoric salamander which was named in his memory as Andrias scheuchzeri.

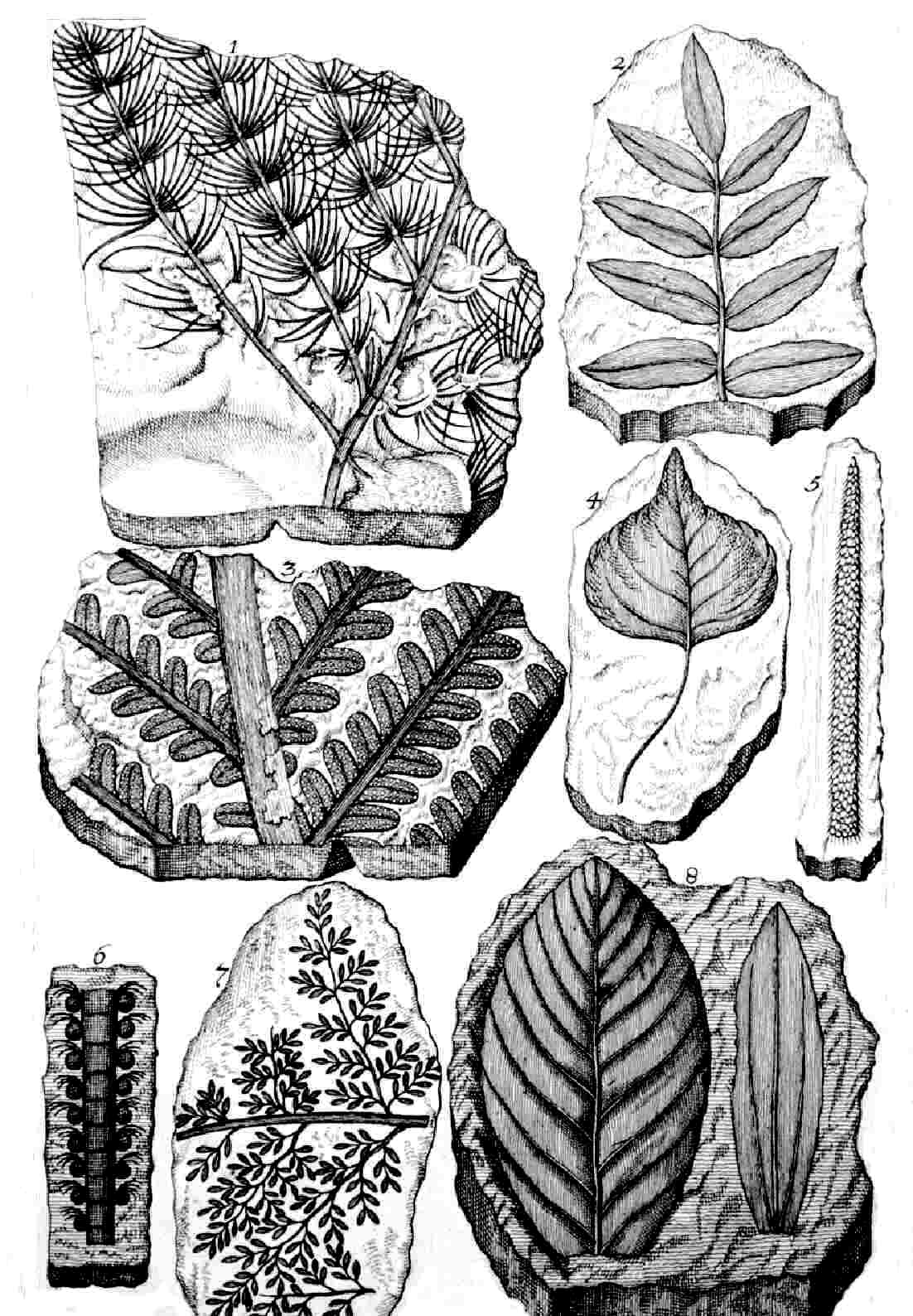
Herbarium diluvianum

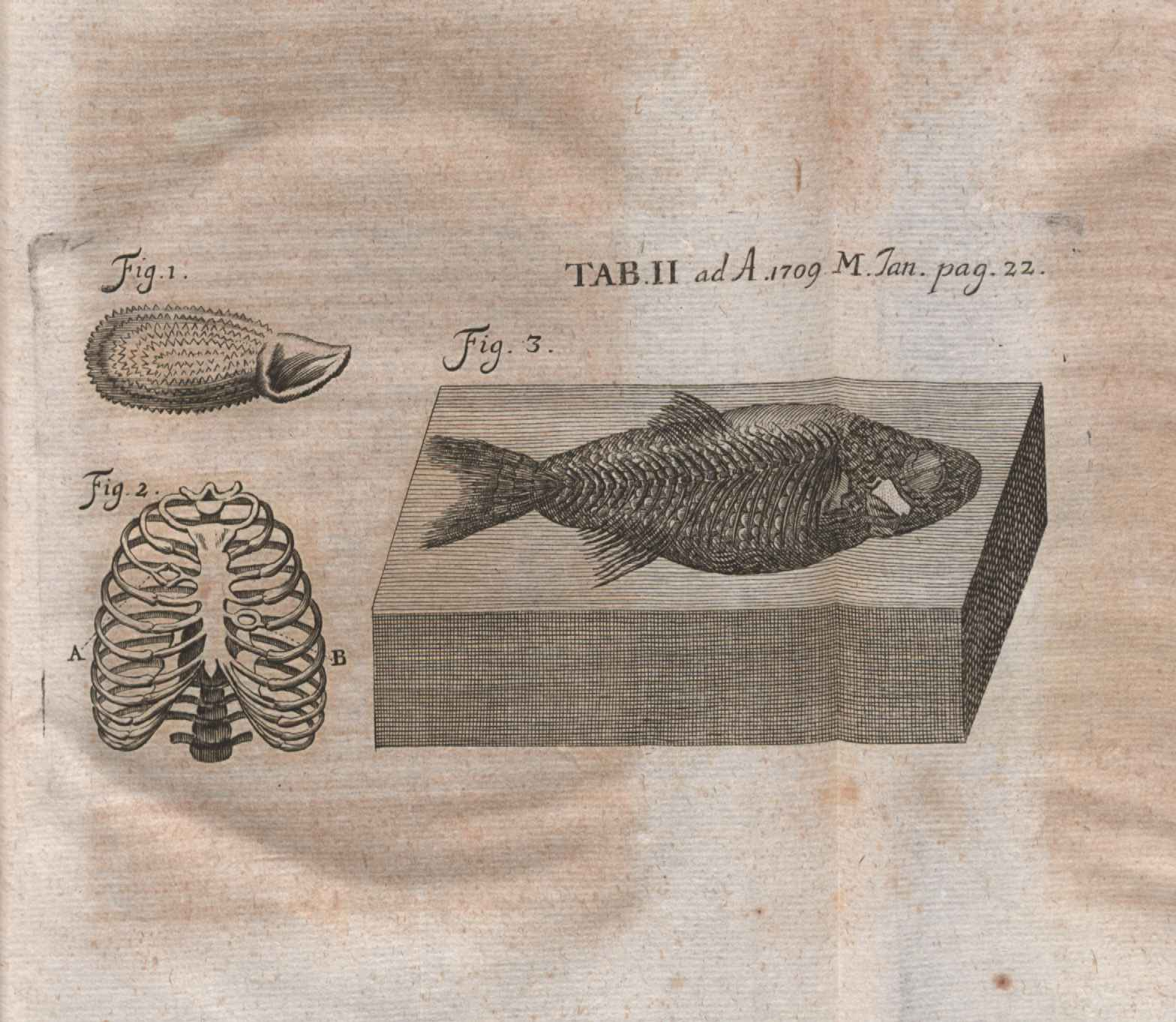
Illustration of critique of Piscium querelae et vindiciae published in Acta Eruditorum, 1709

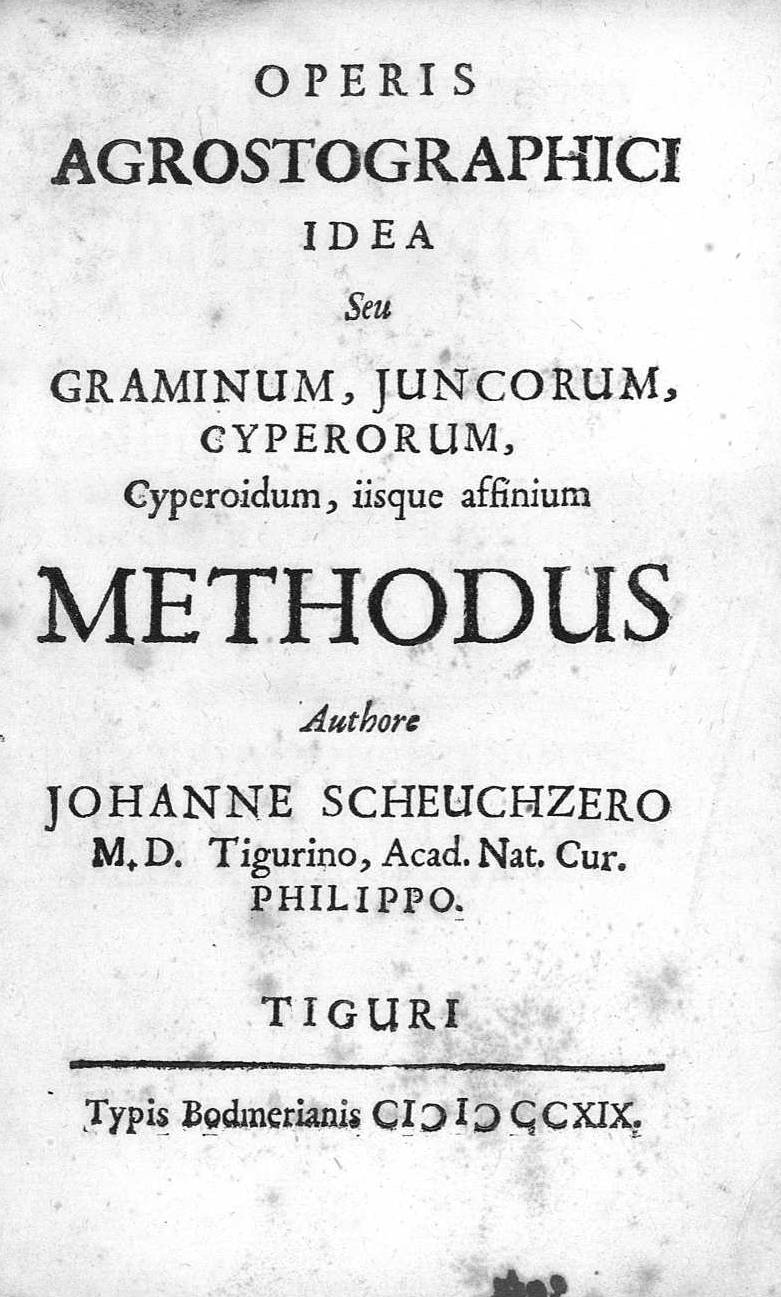
Agrostographia, 1719

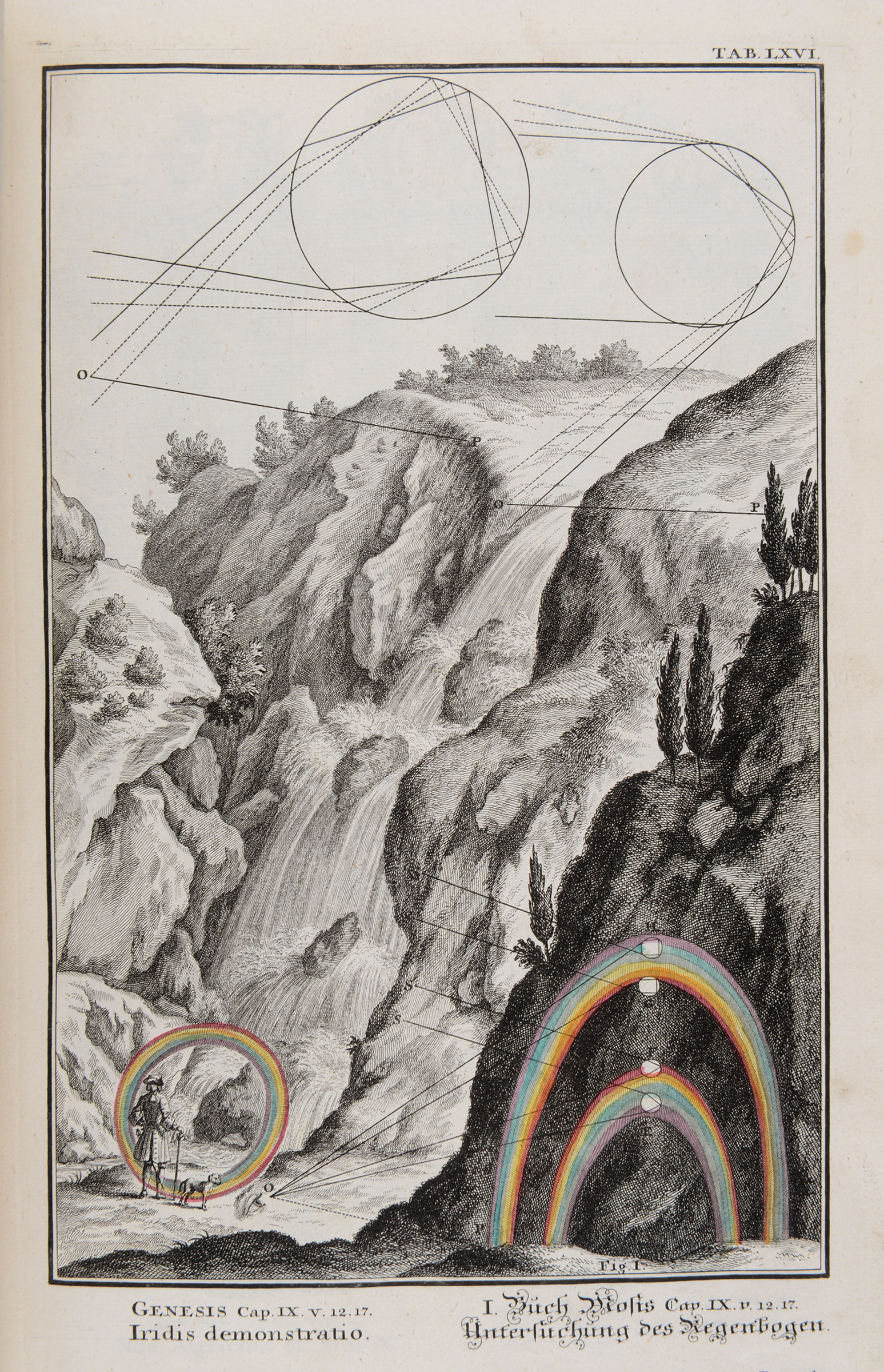
The formation of a rainbow (Physica sacra 1 - pl. 66)

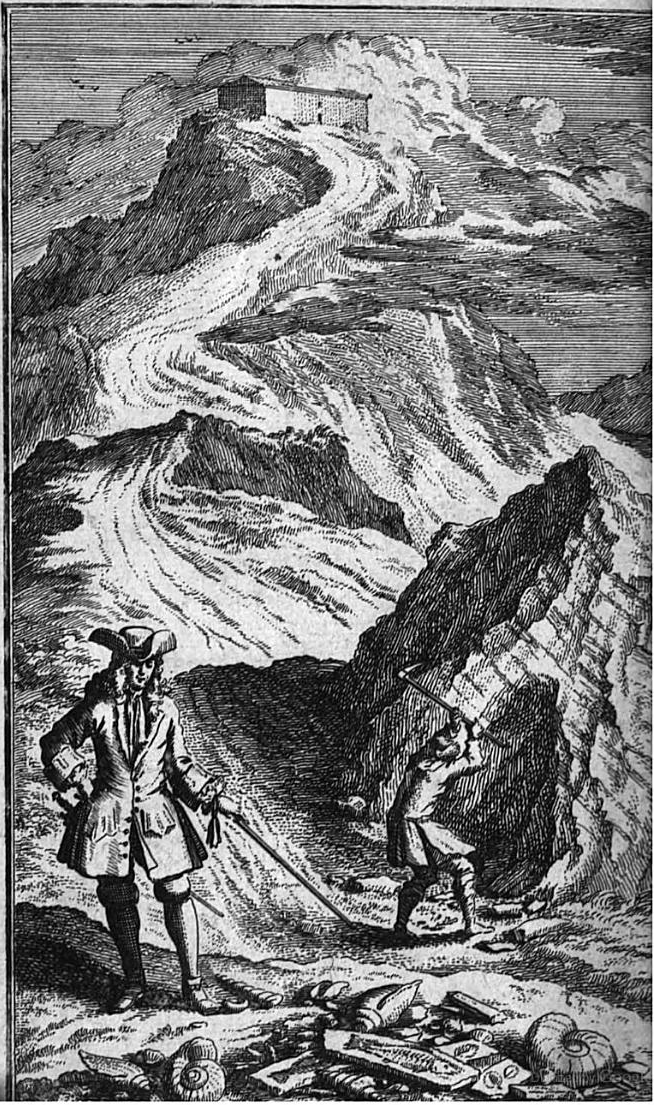
Scheuchzer's frontispiece to "Museum Diluvianum", dedicated to Hans Sloane, 1716

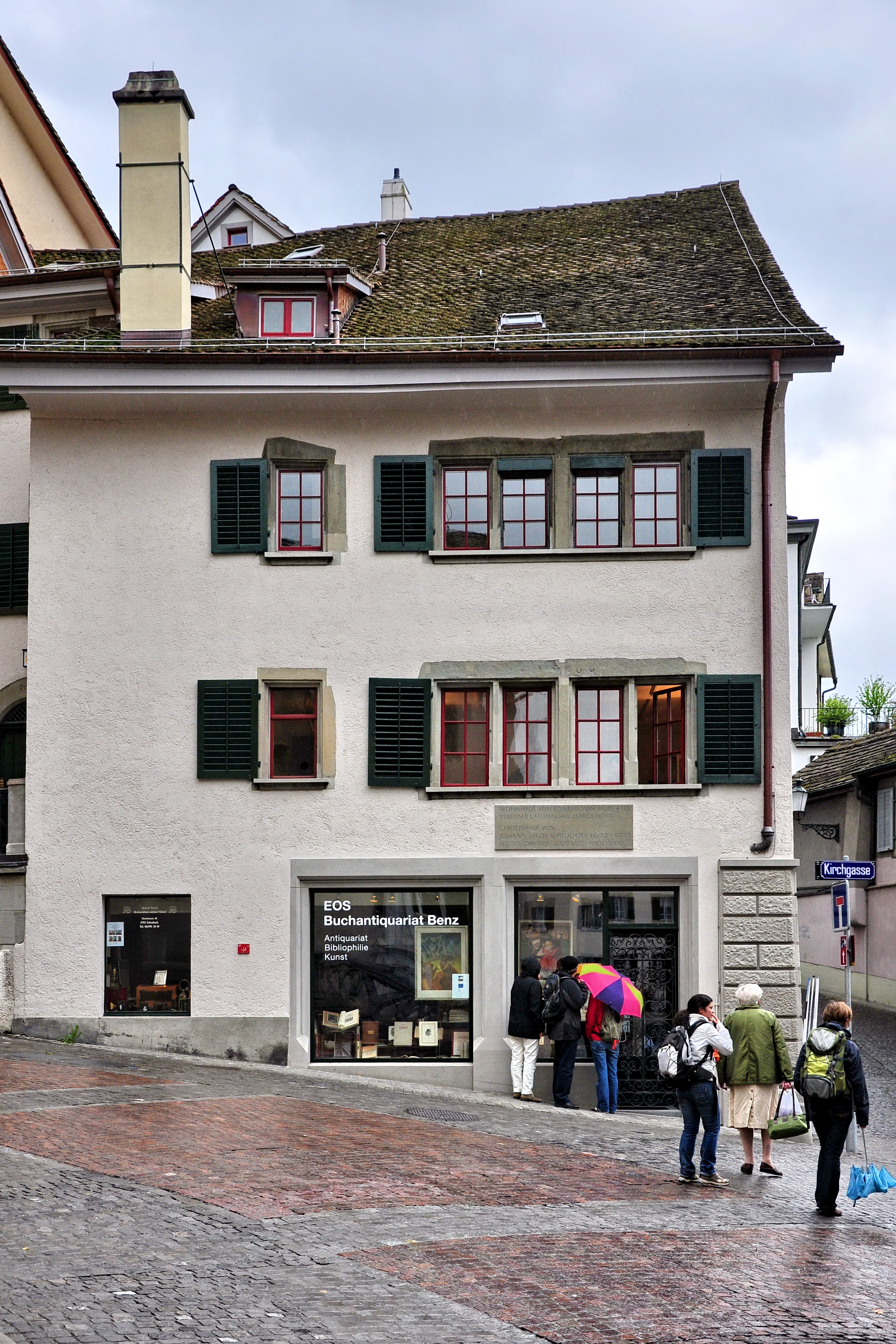
Zürich, Zwingli-Platz (Grossmünster): Former home of Konrad von Mure († 1280) and the house where Johann Jakob Scheuchzer was born

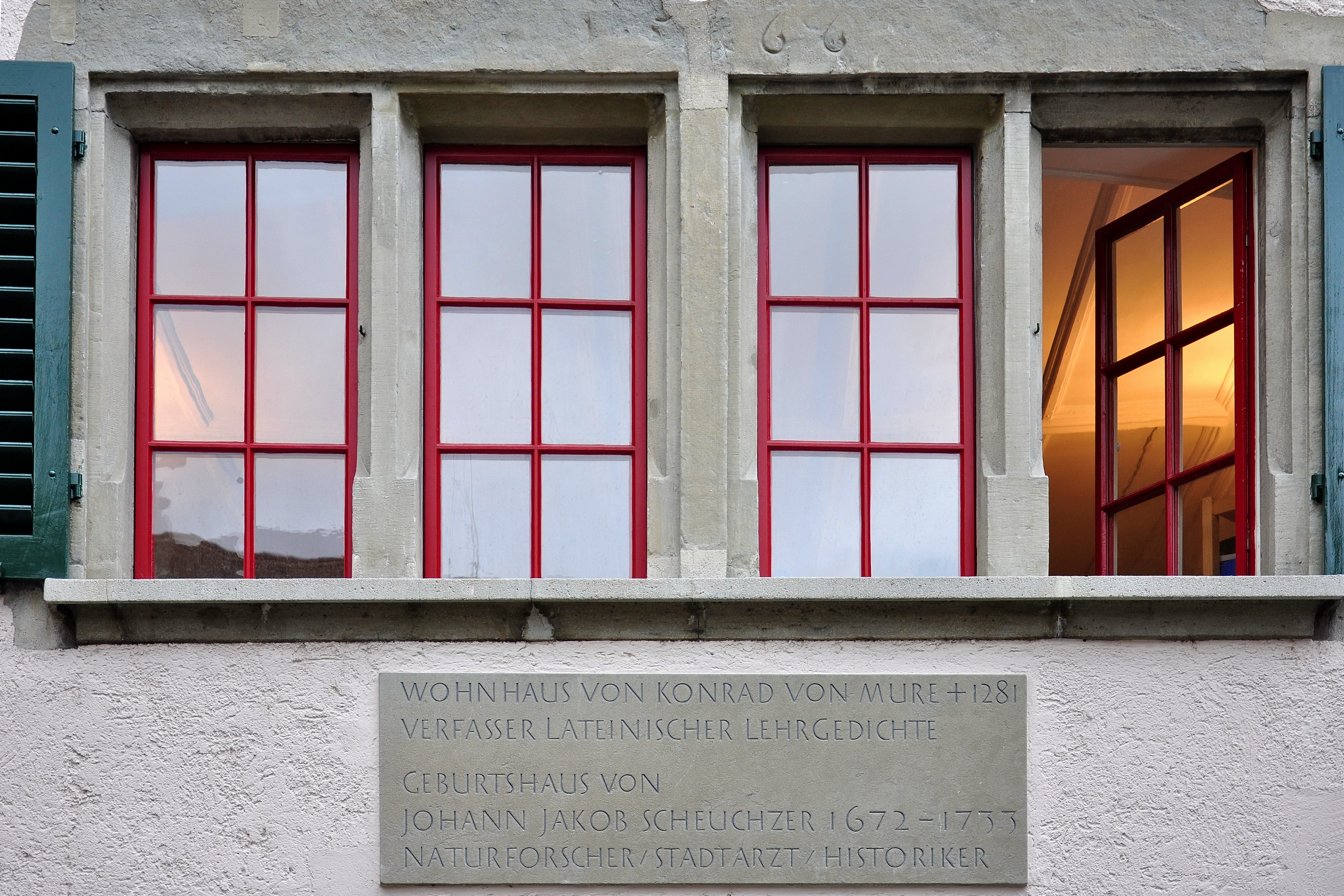
Memorial plate

== Honours and awards ==
In November 1703, he was elected a Fellow of the Royal Society. Scheuchzerhorn (3462 m) and Scheuchzerjoch in the Bernese Alps are named after Johann Jakob Scheuchzer. Scheuchzeriaceae and Scheuchzeria palustris are named in his honour.

== Other sources ==
- Claus Bernet (2003). "Scheuchzer, Johann Jakob (Jacob)". In Bautz, Traugott (ed.). Biographisch-Bibliographisches Kirchenlexikon (BBKL) (in German). Vol. 21. Nordhausen: Bautz. cols. 1312–1355. ISBN 3-88309-110-3.
- - See Franz Xaver Hoeherl, J.J. Scheuchzer, der Begründer d. phys. Geographie d. Hochgebirges (Munich, 1901), a useful pamphlet, conveniently summarizing Scheuchzer's scientific views.
