= Zentralbibliothek Zürich =

Zürich Central Library

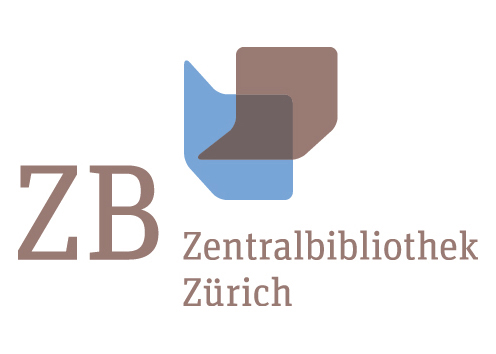

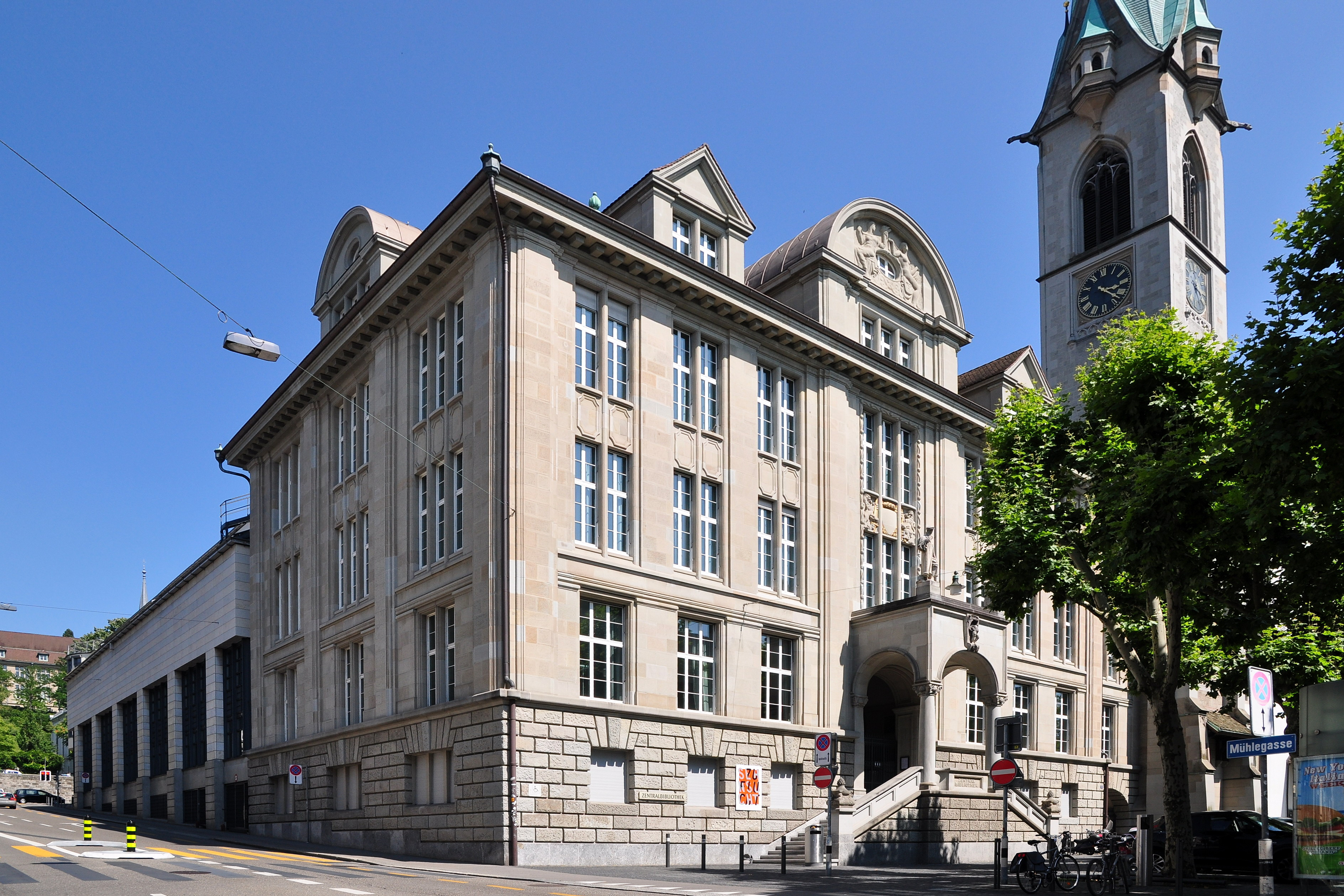
- 47°22′27″N 8°32′43″E
- Location: Zürich

Other information
- Website: Official website

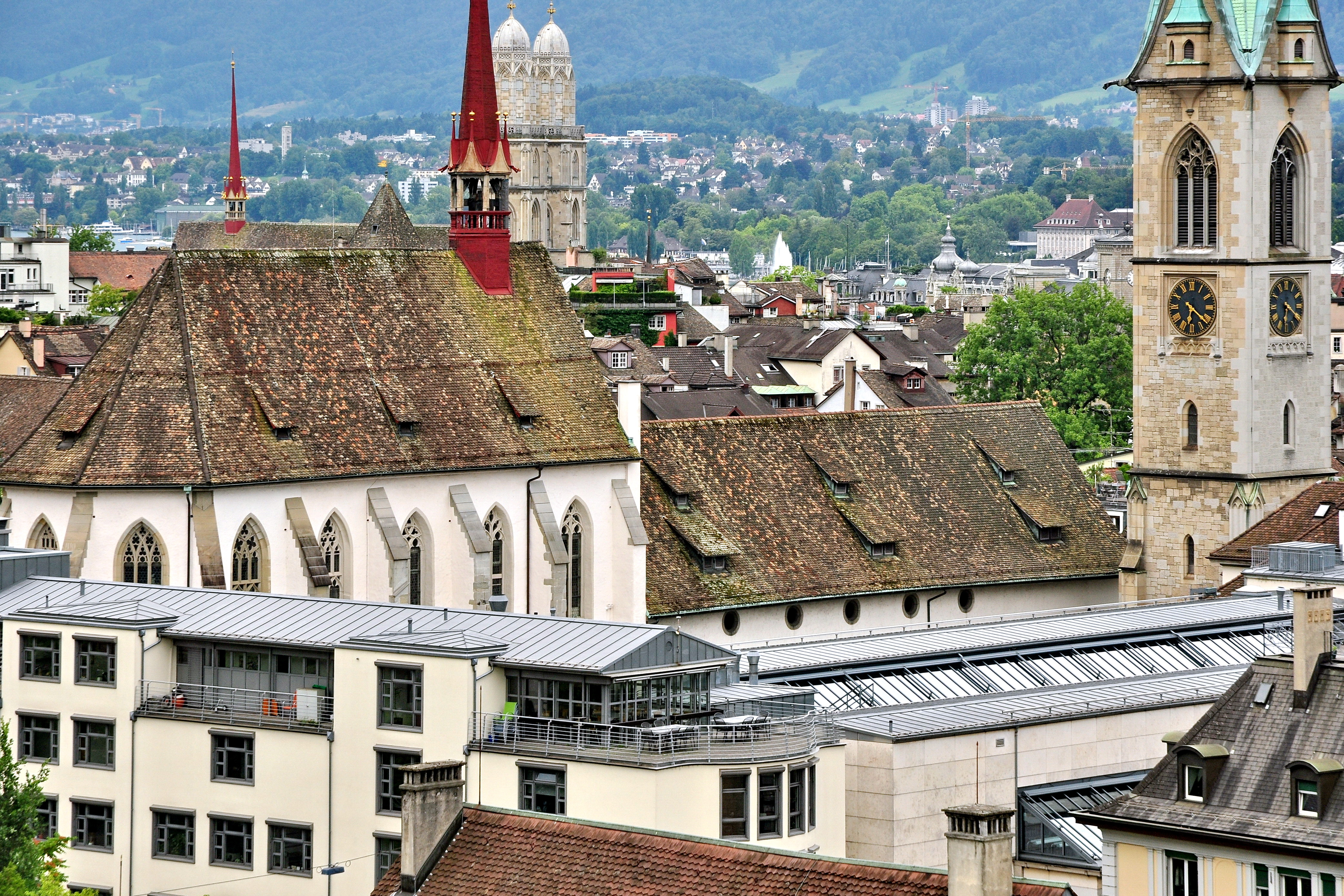
Zentralbibliothek and Prediger Church as seen from ETH Zurich plateau

Zentralbibliothek Zürich (Zürich Central Library) is a library in Zürich, Switzerland. It is the main library of both the city and the University of Zurich, housed in the Predigerkloster, the former Black Friars' abbey, in the old town's Rathaus quarter.

The Zentralbibliothek currently houses some 5.1 million items, among these 3.9 million printed volumes, 124,000 manuscripts, 243,000 maps and 560,000 microfiches.

== History ==
The library was founded in 1914 by a merger of the former cantonal and city libraries. Its history ultimately goes back to the Stiftsbibliothek of the Grossmünster abbey, first attested in 1259. Much of the abbey's library was lost in the Swiss Reformation, especially in an incident of book burning on 14 September 1525, reducing it to a total inventory of 470 volumes. From 1532, Konrad Pellikan (1478–1556) began rebuilding the Stiftsbibliothek, especially with the purchase of Zwingli's private library, and the library catalogue in 1551 lists 770 volumes. The city library had been established in 1634, and its policy to allow access only to citizens of Zürich led to disputes with the university, which led to the establishment of a cantonal library in 1835, built from some 3,500 volumes with 14,000 titles of the Stiftsbibliothek, some 340 volumes of the recent University Library (since 1833) and some 1,700 volumes of the Gymnasiumsbibliothek (since 1827).

== Cultural heritage ==
Predigerkirche and the adjoint Musikabteilung (literally: music department) are listed in the Swiss inventory of cultural property of national and regional significance as a Class object.

== See also ==
- Pestalozzi-Bibliothek Zürich, a public library network in Zürich
