= Rahn =

Rahn may refer to:

== People ==
- Rahn family, a bourgeois family of Zurich
- Arthur Rahn (1897–1962), German military pilot
- David Rahn (1769–1848), Swiss physician
- Hans Heinrich Rahn (mayor) (1593–1669), mayor of Zurich
- Hans Rudolf Rahn (died 1627) (1560–1627), mayor of Zurich
- Hans Rudolf Rahn (died 1655) (1594–1655), mayor of Zurich
- Hartmann Rahn (1721–1792), Swiss merchant
- Helmut Rahn (1929–2003), German footballer
- Johann Rahn (1622–1676), Swiss mathematician
- Johann Heinrich Rahn (physician) (1749–1812), Swiss physician
- Johann Rudolf Rahn (art historian) (1841–1912), Swiss art historian
- Johann Rudolf Rahn (died 1786) (1742–1786), Swiss theologian
- Matthias Rahn (born 1990), German footballer
- Muriel Rahn (1911–1961), American singer and actress
- Otto Rahn (1904–1939), German medievalist and an Obersturmführer of the SS
- Richard W. Rahn (born 1942), American economist
- Rudolf Rahn (1900–1975), German diplomat
- Uwe Rahn (born 1962), German footballer
- Werner Rahn (born 1939), German historian and former naval officer

== Places ==
- Rahn, Iran
- Rahn, Oman
- Rahn Township, Pennsylvania, U.S.

== See also ==
- Taavi Rähn, an Estonian professional footballer
- Rahns, Pennsylvania, U.S.
