= List of oldest banks in continuous operation =

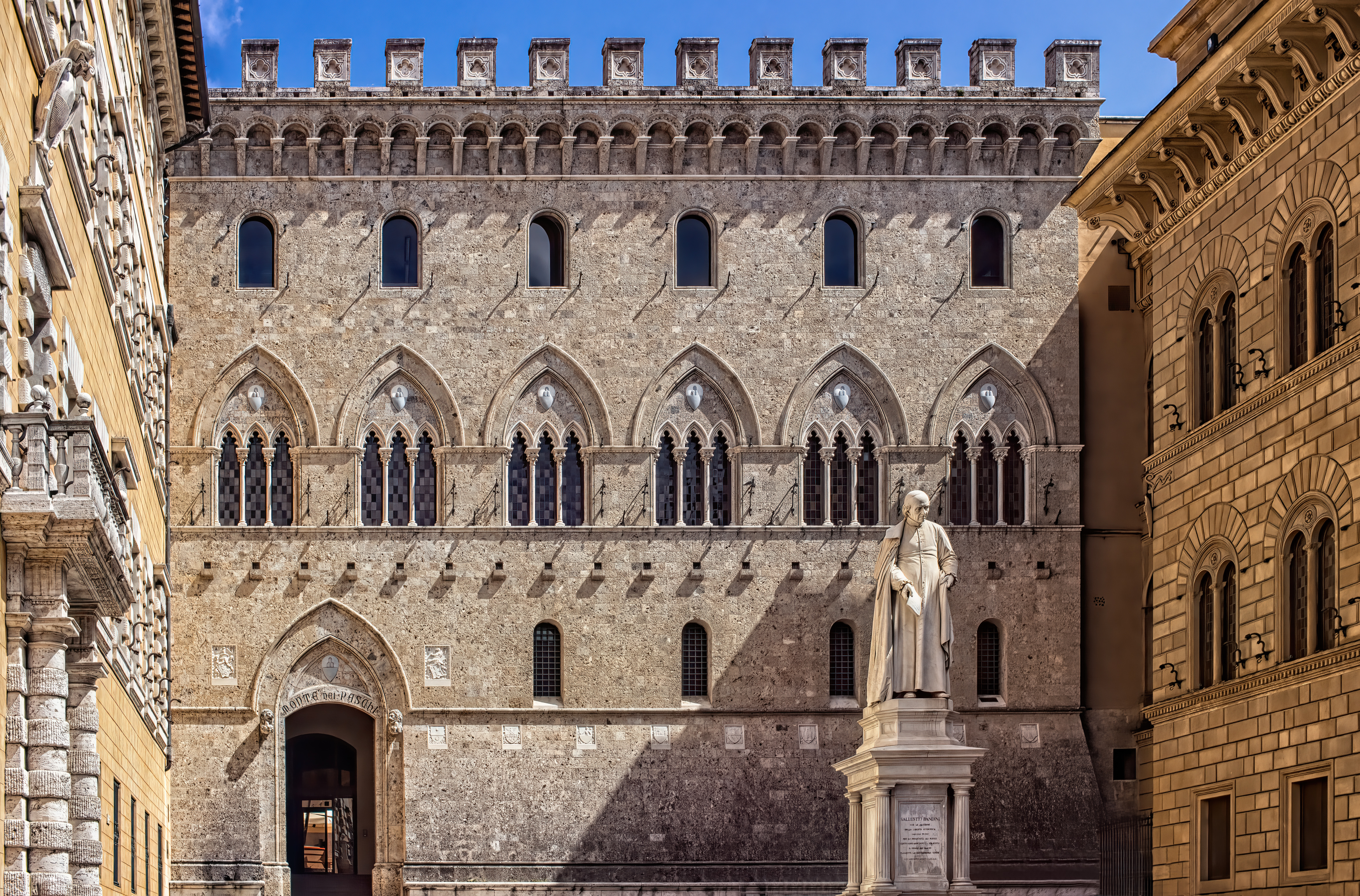
Banca Monte dei Paschi di Siena, headquarters in Siena today

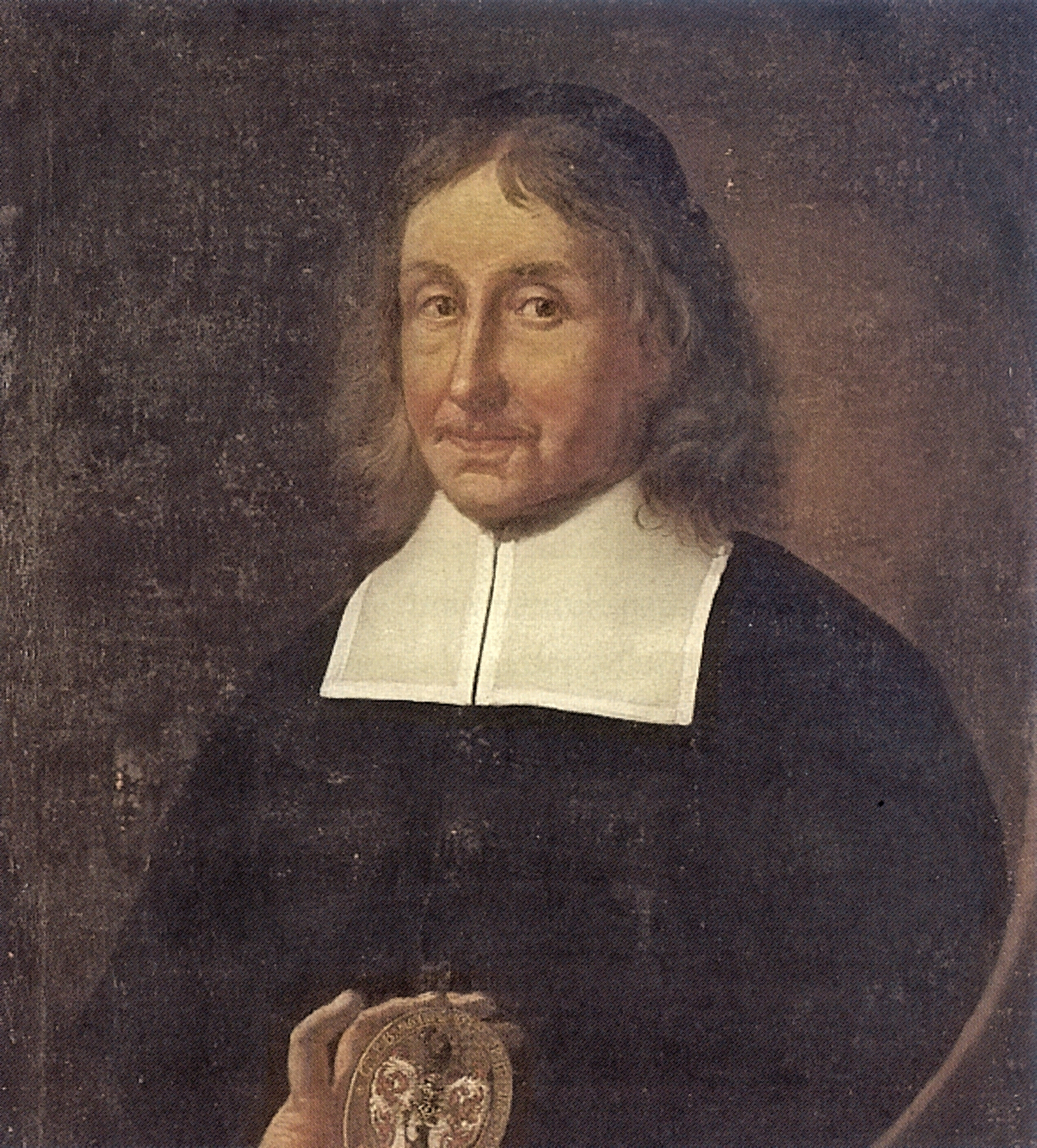
The merchant banker Cornelius Berenberg, a member of the Berenberg family, whose grandfather founded Berenberg Bank in 1590

This list of the oldest banks includes financial institutions in continuous operation, operating with the same legal identity without interruption since their establishment until the present time.

The world's oldest bank is Banca Monte dei Paschi di Siena, while the world's oldest merchant bank is Berenberg Bank. Banca Monte dei Paschi di Siena was founded in its present form in 1624, but traces its history to a mount of piety founded in 1472. The Berenberg company was founded in 1590 and has operated continuously ever since with the same family as owners or major co-owners. Banca Monte dei Paschi di Siena is today a large Italian retail bank, while Berenberg Bank is primarily involved in investment banking and private banking for wealthy customers; in any event Berenberg Bank is the world's oldest merchant bank or investment bank. The world's oldest central bank is the Sveriges Riksbank, which was founded in 1668. Banco di Napoli, which was absorbed by different entities between 2002–2018, had origins dating back to 1539, and until its absorption was likely the oldest bank worldwide in continuous operation; some scholars posit that its origins may be dated back to 1463.

== Banks established in the 15th and 16th centuries ==
Year	Company	Country (historic)	Country (modern)	Notes
1472	Banca Monte dei Paschi di Siena	Siena, Republic of Siena	Italy	The world's oldest bank. Founded as a mount of piety, refounded in its present form in the Republic of Florence in 1624
1590	Berenberg Bank	Hamburg, Holy Roman Empire	Germany	The oldest merchant bank

== Banks established in the 17th century ==
Year	Company	Country (historic)	Country (modern)	Notes
1668	Sveriges Riksbank	Kingdom of Sweden	Sweden	The world's oldest central bank.
1672	C. Hoare & Co.	Kingdom of England	United Kingdom	One of the oldest British banks and the oldest privately owned bank, not a limited company.
1674	Metzler Bank	Free City of Frankfurt	Germany	
1690	Barclays	Kingdom of England	United Kingdom	
1692	Coutts & Co.	Kingdom of England	United Kingdom	Part of NatWest Group.
1694	Bank of England	Kingdom of England	United Kingdom	
1695	Bank of Scotland	Kingdom of Scotland	Scotland	Part of Lloyds Banking Group.

== Banks established in the 18th century ==
Year	Company	Country (historic)	Country (modern)	Notes
1702	Monte de Piedad de Madrid	Spain	Spain	Predecessor institution to Bankia (today part of CaixaBank)
1717	Drummonds Bank	Kingdom of Great Britain	United Kingdom	A branch of the Royal Bank of Scotland
1727	Royal Bank of Scotland	Kingdom of Great Britain	Scotland	Part of NatWest Group
1737	Van Lanschot Kempen	Dutch Republic	Netherlands	The oldest independent bank in the Netherlands and the Benelux.
1747	Banque Nagelmackers	Liège	Belgium	
1750	Rahn+Bodmer	Zürich	Switzerland	
1760	Banque Courtois	Kingdom of France	France	
1765	Lloyds Bank	Kingdom of Great Britain	United Kingdom	Part of Lloyds Banking Group.
1774	Fürstlich Castell'sche Bank	Würzburg	Germany	
1777	Grenke Bank	Baden-Baden, Germany	Germany	Part of GRENKE AG
1780	Landolt & Cie	Neuchâtel	Switzerland	
1782	Bank of Spain	Spain	Spain	
1783	Bank of Ireland	Kingdom of Ireland	Ireland (and Northern Ireland)	
1784	The Bank of New York Mellon Corporation	United States	United States	Oldest US bank tracing to its original incorporation, without resorting to an acquired predecessor
1785	Trinkaus & Burkhardt	Palatinate	Germany	Acquired in 1980s by Midland Bank and then 1992 to British bank HSBC
1786	Hottinger & Cie	Kingdom of France	United Kingdom	Edmond de Rothschild Group acquired a 42.5% stake in Hottinger Group on 31 May 2022
1792	State Street Corporation	United States	United States	Age dated to predecessor Union Bank
1796	Hauck & Aufhäuser	Free City of Frankfurt	Germany	
1796	Lombard Odier & Cie	Geneva	Switzerland	
1798	Donner & Reuschel	Hamburg	Germany	
1798	M. M. Warburg & Co.	Hamburg	Germany	
1799	Bank of the Manhattan Company	United States	United States	Predecessor institution to JPMorgan Chase

== See also ==
- History of banking
- List of oldest companies

== Literature ==
- Manfred Pohl; Sabine Freitag (1994), Handbook on the History of European Banks, European Association for Banking History, Cambridge University Press.
