= Johann Heinrich Rahn =

Johann Heinrich Rahn or Hans Heinrich Rahn may refer to:

- Hans Heinrich Rahn (mayor) (1593–1669), mayor of Zurich
- Johann Heinrich Rahn (mathematician) (1622–1676), Swiss mathematician, son of the above
- Johann Heinrich Rahn (physician) (1749–1812), Swiss physician
