= Hans Rudolf Rahn =

Hans Rudolf Rahn may refer to:

- Hans Rudolf Rahn (died 1627) (1560–1627), mayor of Zurich
- Hans Rudolf Rahn (died 1655) (1594–1655), mayor of Zurich, son of the above

== See also ==
- Johann Rudolf Rahn (art historian) (1841–1912), Swiss art historian
