= Rehn =

Origin
- Languages: Swedish, German
- Meaning: ?
- Region of origin: Sweden, Finland, Germany

Rehn is a Scandinavian and German surname, also used in Finland.

== Geographical distribution ==
As of 2014, 32.3% of all known bearers of the surname Rehn were residents of Germany (frequency 1:32,130), 25.7% of Sweden (1:4,951), 18.9% of the United States (1:247,942), 7.7% of Finland (1:9,223), 3.6% of Australia (1:84,605), 2.9% of Brazil (1:925,395), 2.1% of Canada (1:227,148), 1.6% of Iraq (1:277,950) and 1.0% of Austria (1:110,576).

In Sweden, the frequency of the surname was higher than national average (1:4,951) in the following counties:

1. Jönköping County (1:2,150)
2. Västerbotten County (1:2,340)
3. Östergötland County (1:2,445)
4. Blekinge County (1:3,499)
5. Gävleborg County (1:3,590)
6. Dalarna County (1:3,781)
7. Kalmar County (1:4,727)
8. Örebro County (1:4,834)
9. Uppsala County (1:4,858)

In Finland, the frequency of the surname was higher than national average (1:9,223) in the following regions:

1. Åland (1:1,292)
2. Uusimaa (1:4,520)
3. Southwest Finland (1:4,750)
4. Päijänne Tavastia (1:7,220)
5. Southern Savonia (1:7,948)

In Germany, the frequency of the surname was higher than national average (1:32,130) in the following states:

1. Saxony (1:5,539)
2. Rhineland-Palatinate (1:11,734)
3. Hesse (1:19,037)
4. Hamburg (1:21,791)
5. Schleswig-Holstein (1:27,226)

== People ==
- Elisabeth Rehn (born 1935), Finnish politician, the country's first female Minister of Defence
- Frank Knox Morton Rehn (1848–1914), American artist
- James Abram Garfield Rehn (1881–1965), American entomologist
- Olli Rehn (born 1962), Finnish politician, European Commissioner for Economic and Monetary Affairs and the euro
- Stefan Rehn (born 1966), Swedish football player and manager
- Trista Rehn (born 1972), Trista Nicole Sutter (née Rehn), the first Bachelorette
- Vuokko Rehn (1938–2011), Finnish politician
- Walter Richard Rehn (1884–1951), German painter

== See also ==
- Reen
- Rehm
- Rahn (disambiguation)
- Rähn
