= Bank Lombard Odier & Co =

Swiss Private Bank

Bank Lombard Odier & Co Ltd

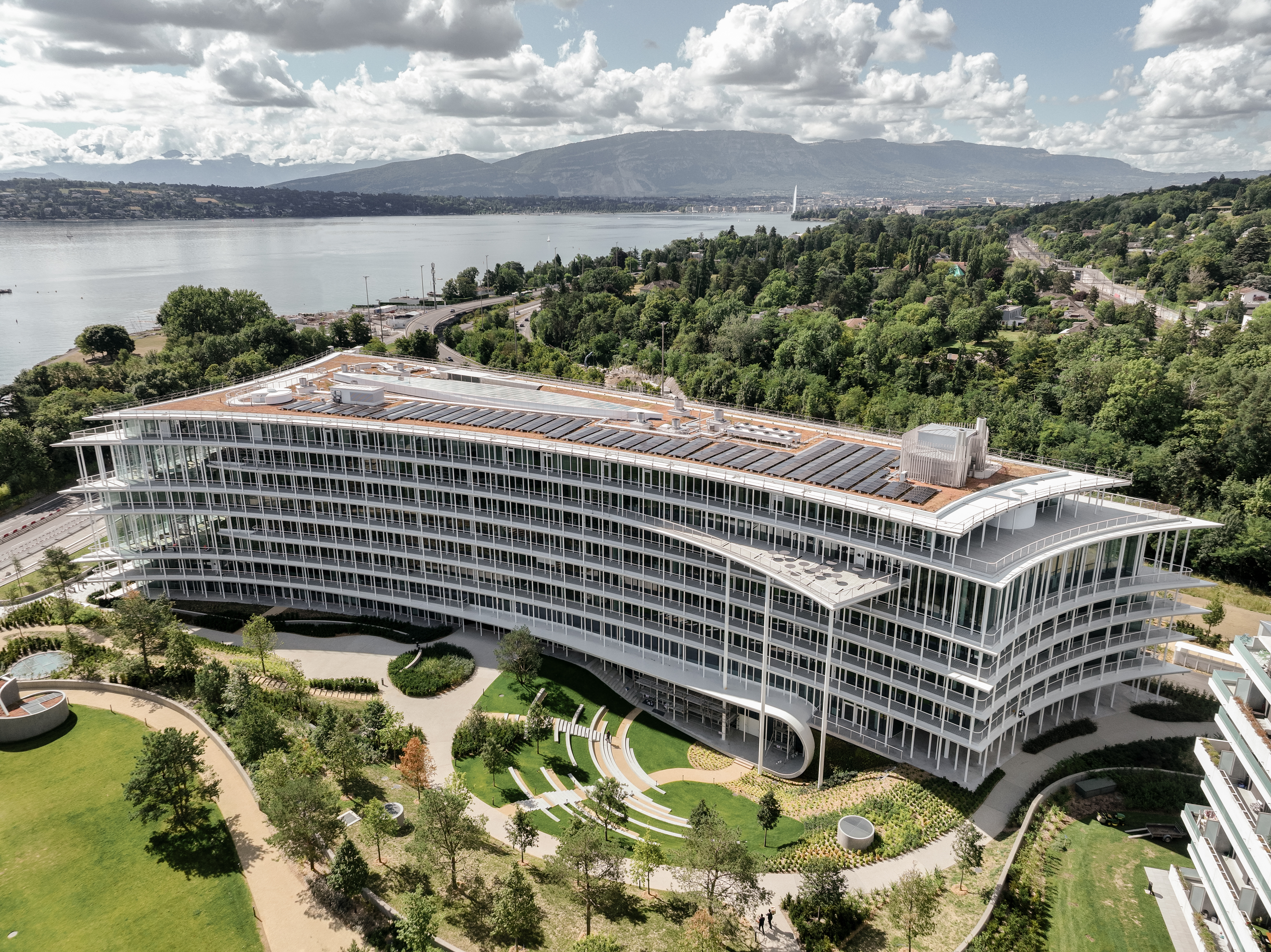
- 1Roof, the company's headquarters, in Bellevue, Geneva
- Type: Corporate partnership (société en commandite par actions)
- Industry: Private banking
- Predecessor: Lombard, Odier & Cie; Darier, Hentsch & Cie.
- Founded: January 11, 1796; 230 years ago
- Founder: Henri Hentsch, Jean-Gédéon Lombard
- Headquarters: Geneva, Switzerland
- Key people: Hubert Keller, Frédéric Rochat, Denis Pittet, Alexandre Zeller, Jean-Pascal Porcherot, and Alexandre Meyer.
- Net income: 200,000,000 Swiss franc (2025)
- AUM: ▲CHF 349 billion (2023)
- Total assets: 15,000,000,000 Swiss franc (2025)
- Number of employees: 2,871 (2025)
- Capital ratio: 33%
- Rating: Fitch: AA−
- Website: www.lombardodier.com

The Lombard Odier Group is an independent Swiss banking group based in Geneva. Its operations are organised into three divisions: private banking (wealth management), asset management, and IT and back and middle office services for other financial institutions. In 2025, the bank had total client assets of CHF 349 billion, which makes it one of the biggest players in the Swiss private banking sector.

The group was formed in the summer of 2002, as Lombard, Odier, Darier, Hentsch & Cie, by the merger of Lombard, Odier & Cie and Darier, Hentsch & Cie. As the latter was originally founded in 1796, the group has a claim to being the oldest private bank in Geneva. The company name was simplified to Lombard Odier Group in 2010, although the firm continues to include on its official logo the names of the four founding partners.

Since 2014, the bank has held the status of Limited Liability Company (LLC). The Lombard Odier Group is a legal holding company under Swiss law, bearing the name Lombard Odier Company SCmA since 2016. This holding company owns all firms belonging to the group, most notably the bank Lombard Odier & Cie SA, and Lombard Odier Asset Management (Europe) Limited in London, which forms the asset management branch of the group. Lombard Odier Investment Managers (LOIM) is the name the group is known by in the international field of asset management.

Outside of Switzerland, the group has branches in Europe, the Americas, Asia and the Middle East. Including its network of collaborators, the group had around 2,900 employees worldwide at the end of 2025.

== History ==
=== The founding families ===
The Lombard family (from Lombardi) arrived in Geneva in 1573 from Tortorella (Kingdom of Naples), fleeing religious persecution under viceroy Antoine Perrenot de Granvelle. The two sons of Theodoro Lombardi, César and Marc-Antoine Lombard, performed dressage and were involved in the horse trade. They received the title of burgesses of Geneva in 1589 for their services in the fight against the duke of Savoie. Jean-Gédéon Lombard, a 6th generation descendant of César Lombard, became associated with the bank Hentsch, Lombard & Cie in 1798, marking the entry of the Lombard family into the field of Genevan banking.

The Odier family is first documented as being in Geneva circa 1714, the same time when Antoine Odier received his title as Genevan burgess. The family came from Pont-en-Royans in France. Members of the family held positions as politicians, doctors, artists, engineers, and then bankers. Charles Odier became associated with the bank Lombard, Bonna & Cie in 1830, which then became Lombard, Odier & Cie.

The Darier family arrived in Geneva in 1738 from the Dauphiné region in France. Louis Darier died accidentally shortly after the birth of his son, Hugues Darier, who became a prominent figure in clockmaking and obtained the title of burgess of Geneva in 1787. Jules Darier-Rey, Hugues’ grandson, became associated with the bank Chaponnière & Cie in 1873. The firm became Darier, Chaponnière & Cie in 1875, and then Darier & Cie in 1880. Another of Hugues Darier's sons, Jean-Louis Darier (1766–1825), earlier on contributed to the beginnings of the bank Ferrier, Lullin & Cie in 1795, but this organisation remains without any link to what is now Lombard Odier.

The Hentsch family arrived in Geneva circa 1758, while Benjamin-Gottlob Hentsch (a clergyman) emigrated from Lower-Lusatia to become a tutor in Switzerland. His son, Henri Hentsch (1761–1835), founded the family bank in 1796.

=== Origins of the bank (1796–1800) ===
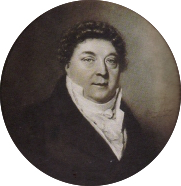
Henri Hentsch (1761–1835)

From 1789, the business and finance trade in Geneva were impacted by the French Revolution. In 1793, Henri Hentsch was arrested by the Genevan revolutionaries and temporarily exiled to Nyon, where he began a silk trading business with an associate, Edmé Mémo. Despite the environment of economic difficulty and increased unemployment, Henri Hentsch came back to Geneva to found H. Hentsch & Cie on 11 January 1796, at the age of 35. The firm, designated as a house of "Silk and Sales", traded silk in parallel with its banking activities as a first step. This was a classic format at the time, but it quickly abandoned trading to concentrate on banking as its sole focus. The firm allowed traders to take out loans, negotiate debts, settle bills of exchange, and more generally it allowed the trade of precious metals to be conducted, and exchange transactions to be carried out. All of this occurred at a time when several currencies were in circulation in Geneva.

On 26 April 1798, the Republic of Geneva was annexed by the French Republic. Henri Hentsch's cousin, Jean-Gédéon Lombard, then became a member of the Executive Council of the City of Geneva. Initially a proctor of Henri Hentsch, Jean-Gédéon became his partner at the bank on 19 June 1798. The firm then took the name Henri Hentsch & Lombard. However, not long after this, Henri Hentsch and Jean-Gédéon Lombard came to a disagreement on the strategy they should take facing the climate of local economic downturn; Jean-Gédéon Lombard wanted to limit the risks imposed by concentrating on bills of exchange operations which generated fixed commissions, while Henri Hentsch, renowned for his entrepreneurial and tenacious character, saw them moving into the international market, particularly for the finance of operations led by the First French Empire. The two partners separated amicably on 22 September 1800, and the bank returned to its former name Henri Hentsch & Cie, while Jean-Gédéon Lombard partnered with his brother-in-law Jean-Jacques Lullin to create the bank Lombard Lullin & Cie.

=== Lombard, Odier & Cie ===
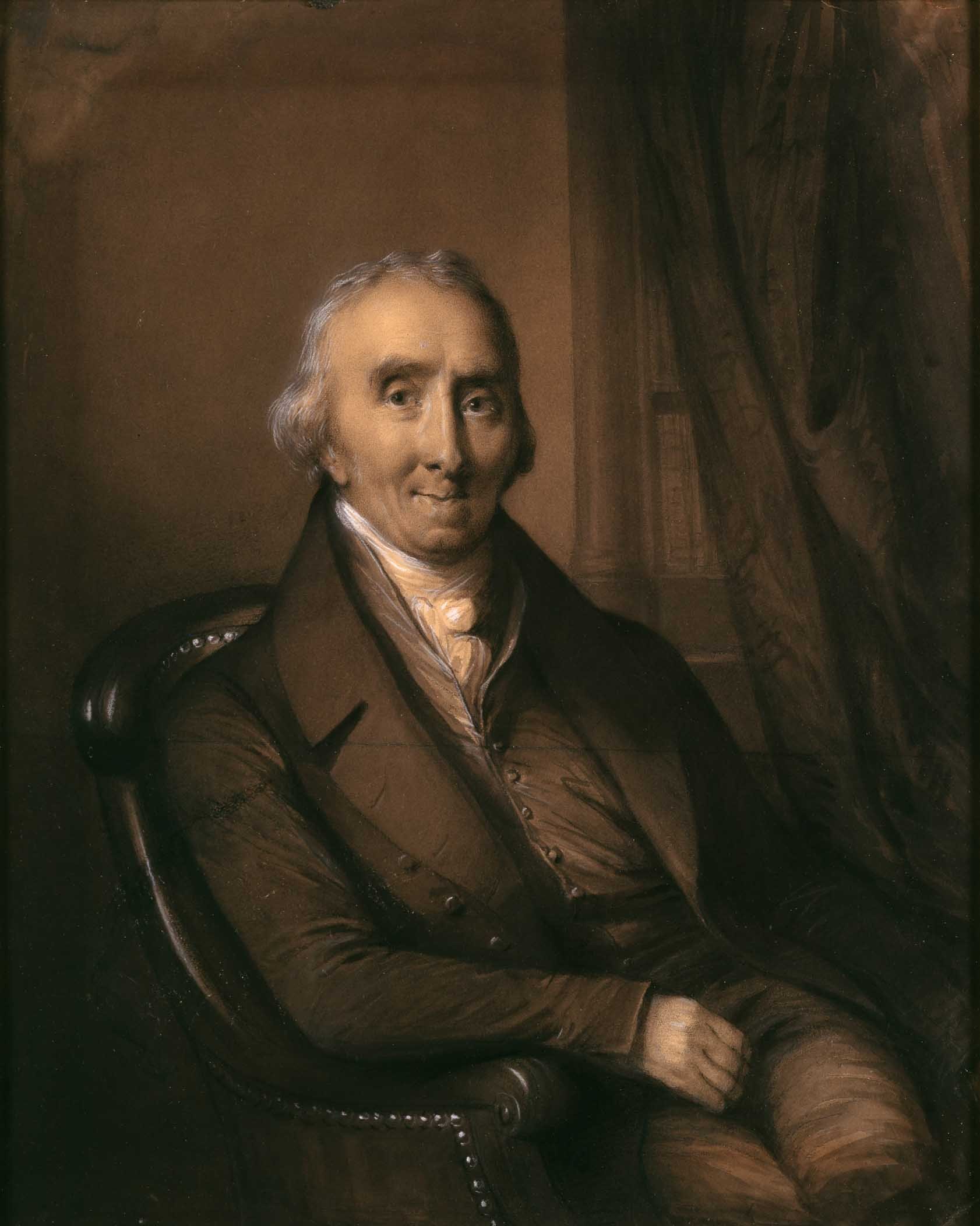
Jean-Gédéon Lombard (1763–1848)

Lombard, Lullin & Cie were heavily affected by the economic environment during the bank's first few years. From 1800, the bankruptcy of the firm Corsanges in Lyon resulted in Jean-Gédéon Lombard losing 30,000 francs, causing Jean-Jacques Lullin to go bankrupt. In spite of this, the firm was able to continue in business. Jean-Jacques Lullin left the bank on 31 December 1815, but continued as a limited partner until his death in 1837. Therefore, from 1816 the firm took the name Jean-Gédéon Lombard & Cie until 1 January 1826, when Jean-Gédéon Lombard partnered with Paul-Frédéric Bonna. The bank then took the name Lombard, Bonna & Cie. On 31 March 1830, Paul Frédéric Bonna left the firm to start his own bank, Bonna & Cie. The bank remained active for almost a century, before being absorbed into Hentsch & Cie in 1920.

In 1830, Jean-Gédéon Lombard (aged 66), handed over the bank to his eldest son Jean-Eloi Lombard. He then appointed Charles Odier as associate manager on 1 April 1830, and the bank became Lombard, Odier & Cie. Charles Odier, who was 25 years old at the time, had learned the banking profession from the firm Gabriel Odier & Cie, which was managed by his Parisian cousin, and held significant assets from the success of the company F. Courant & Odier, which he founded in 1826 in Le Havre for importing cotton from the USA. Jean-Eloi Lombard dedicated himself to local business while Charles Odier concerned himself with international business, particularly thanks to contacts that he had maintained from the US. Under the management of Jean-Eloi Lombard and Charles Odier, the bank financed large infrastructure works which characterised the Industrial Revolution. In 1834, Lombard, Odier & Cie co-financed the construction work at the Canal de Roanne in Digoin, a project which turned out to be unprofitable despite the successful completion of the canal. The firm then embarked on financing railways, and from 1852 to 1872, Charles Odier acted as one of the administrators of the West Switzerland Company.

In 1834, Alexandre Lombard, the third son of Jean-Gédéon Lombard (aged 24), became a managing partner for the bank. He was responsible for steering Lombard, Odier & Cie towards the American market, at a time when the American frontier needed both funding and construction for facilities, roads, railways and canals. This approach, which was deemed risky due to it coinciding with the end of the American financial crisis of 1837, proved to be a winning strategy ten years later. As the political and economic environment in Europe deteriorated following the revolts of 1848, the US experienced great expansion. Alexandre Lombard prioritised financing American railway companies. The bank issued letters to its clients containing quotes for international stock, at a time when these were difficult to access. In 1857, the partners from Lombard, Odier & Cie participated in creating the Geneva Stock Exchange.

On 1 December 1859, the only son of Charles Odier, Jacques (also known as James) Odier, became a partner at the bank. This followed his trip to the US in 1854 and his marriage to Blanche Lombard in 1856, the daughter of Jean-Eloi. Jacques Odier continued to grow Lombard, Odier & Cie on American soil. In 1870 he joined the executive board for the Genevan branch of what would become the Banque de Paris et des Pays-Bas (Bank of Paris and the Netherlands). Along with Jules Darier-Rey, in 1872 he also co-founded the Genevan life insurance company Genevoise Compagnie d'Assurance sur la Vie, which would later be chaired by his son Émile and then his grandson Edmond. Alexis Lombard, the son of Jean-Eloi Lombard and brother-in-law of Jacques Odier, became a partner in 1866. He became a founding member of the Chamber of Commerce of Geneva in 1872, created the Genevan Bank of loans and deposits in 1881, and became a member of the board of the Swiss National Bank after it was created in 1907.

Jules Verne mentioned Lombard, Odier & Cie in his novel From the Earth to the Moon (1865). In the novel, the bank collected donations to finance the scientific expedition. "Subscription lists were opened in all the principal cities of the Union, with a central office at the Baltimore Bank, 9 Baltimore Street. In addition, subscriptions were received at the following banks in the different states of the two continents: [...] At Berlin, Mendelssohn. At Geneva, Lombard, Odier and Co. At Constantinople, The Ottoman Bank.".

Alexis Lombard and Jacques Odier remained partners at the bank for half a century, continuing to manage the firm through the First World War, while their descendants Albert Lombard and Émile Odier were conscripted into the Swiss army. Throughout the war, business was unstable for the bank; nevertheless, they made it through this time without facing any major adversities, thanks to the strength of the Swiss franc and the country's neutrality, which allowed Swiss banks to act as places of refuge in Europe. Moreover, the bank remained primarily focused on investments in the US, which were not directly affected by the conflict. At the beginning of the 20th century, Lombard, Odier & Cie with only sixteen employees and three office staff, was one of the largest private banks in Geneva.

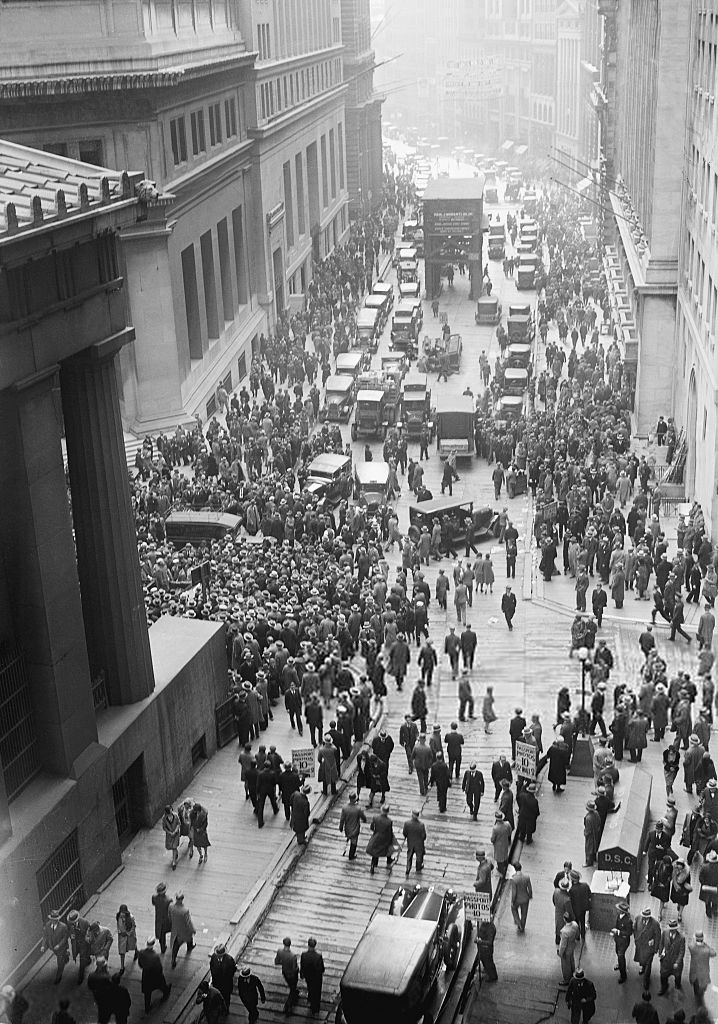
The Wall Street crash of 1929 had wide repercussions in Europe and on Swiss banks

After the Great War, Émile Odier, (partner from 1890), Albert Lombard (partner from 1908), Albert's first cousin Jean Lombard (partner from 1913), and Émile's son Edmond Odier (partner from 1919) took over the management of the bank. In 1921, Lombard, Odier & Cie assumed ownership of the bank Lenoir, Julliard & Cie which was created in 1795. In 1929 and at the beginning of the 1930s, the Swiss financial sector was affected by the Wall Street crash of 1929 and the Great Depression, which impacted the whole of Europe. Several Swiss banks recapitalised or had to close, such as the Banque de Genève (1931) and the Comptoir d’Escompte de Genève (1934). Affected by its exposure to American markets, but eager to show that it would not be brought down by difficulties, Lombard, Odier & Cie changed its statutes in 1933 to become a general partnership, which held the group of acting partners responsible with their own personal assets in case of collapse. Nevertheless, the bank avoided this situation, and even absorbed Hentsch, Forget & Cie in 1934. In 1937, with the death of Edmond Odier, his wife Francine Odier-Dunant became a non-executive partner of the firm so that it could keep its registered company name and its status. She kept this position until her son Marcel Odier succeeded her in 1948.

At the outbreak of the Second World War in 1939, the bank Lombard, Odier & Cie had 75 collaborators, 38 of which were conscripted by the Swiss army. In 1940, Georges Lombard became a partner but was also conscripted. In 1941, the bank took ownership of SAGED, bringing with Jean E. Bonna (great-grandson of Frédéric Bonna) and several others as partners for the bank Lombard, Odier & Cie. As in the previous world war, the bank managed its way through this time thanks to the country's neutrality, which meant that Swiss banks were entrusted with the role as place of refuge for foreign and national capital.

After the Second World War, business grew again: the bank's archives estimate that in 1950 its private clients’ assets reached nearly a billion Swiss francs and mostly came from Switzerland, France and Belgium. Under the management of Marcel Odier, the bank became international, opening its first branch in Montreal in 1951, and established its first investment funding in Canadian real estate aimed at its private clients. In 1957, Thierry Barbey became a partner at the bank, and in 1961 his first cousin Yves Oltramare reached the same status. They then created a financial analysis branch in the bank, and guided Lombard, Odier & Cie towards a new venture in managing investment funds, aimed at a client base of institutional investors which had just begun to emerge (pension organisations and insurance companies among others). In doing so, Lombard, Odier & Cie regularly began to introduce funds in which institutional investors could invest money for them to manage. With the arrival of Jean-François Chaponnière, Alain Patry, and Fernand Oltramare as partners in 1964, then of Laurent Dominici and Pierre Keller in 1970, the bank continued developing its base of international institutional clients, and opened divisions in America, Europe, the Middle East and Asia. In 1983, Lombard, Odier & Cie introduced a fund called "SCI/TECH" aimed at institutional clients, in collaboration with Merrill Lynch Asset Management and Nomura Capital Management. The fund raised 835 million dollars after when it was launched, making it the biggest fundraiser in the history of investment funding at the time. At the end of the 1990s, Lombard, Odier & Cie had around 800 employees, 600 of which were in Geneva, and 200 in foreign offices. The firm merged with Darier, Hentsch & Cie in the summer of 2002.

=== Darier, Hentsch & Cie ===
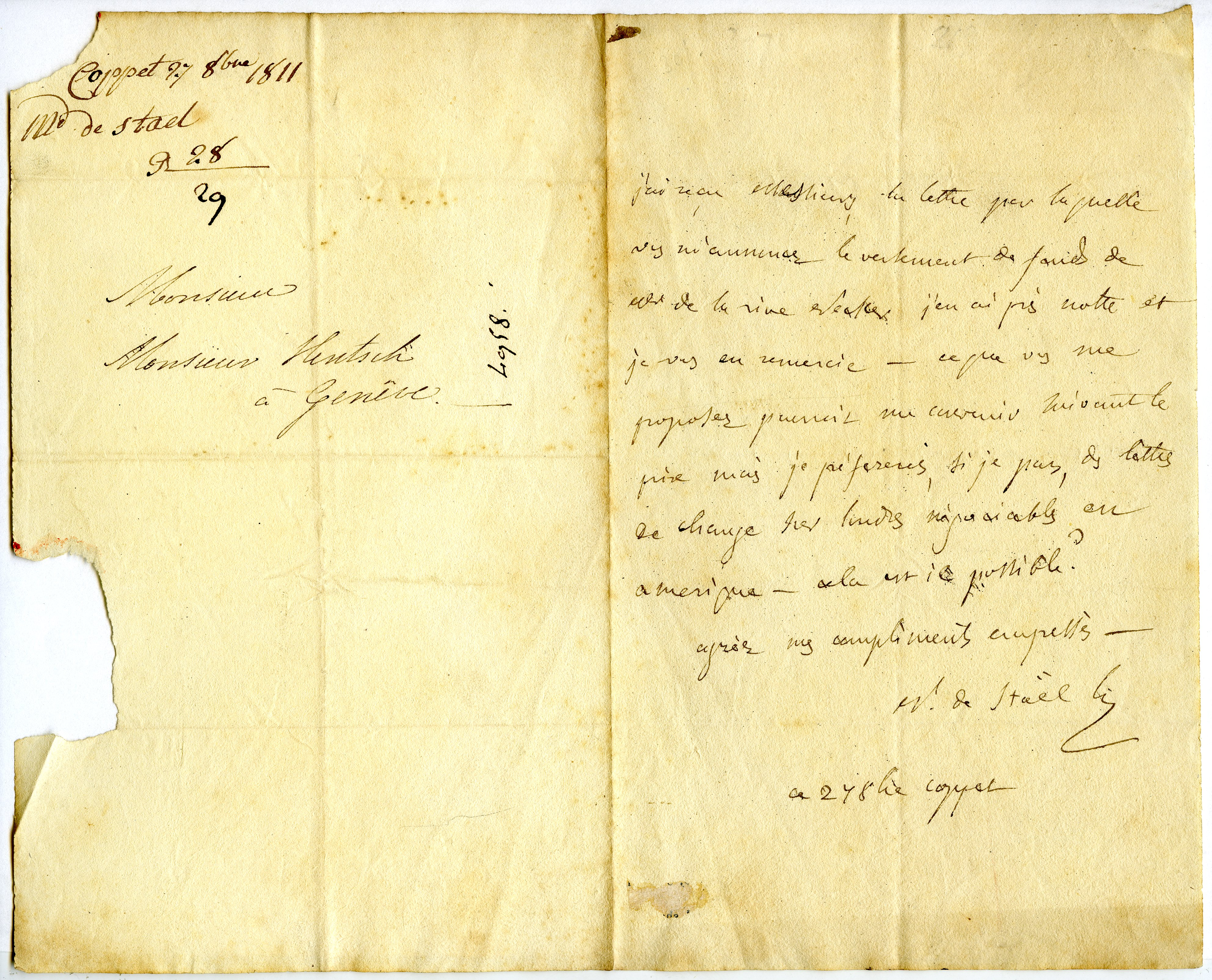
Letter to Henri Hentsch from Madame de Staël, inquiring about promissory notes negotiable in the United States (1811)

Henri Hentsch turned to financing the French Empire from the year 1800. The bank Henri Hentsch & Cie most notably organised the transfer of funds to Italy, where the Empire was expanding. Thanks to its operations, Henri Hentsch had developed good relationships with the French upper class. In 1812, he founded the bank Henri Hentsch, Blanc & Cie in Paris, then settled in the French capital the following year, delegating the management of the Genevan bank to his three sons. In 1826, he founded a second Parisian bank, Hentsch, Lecointe, Desarts & Cie. After his death on 14 August 1835, his sons had already been for some time partners at the bank Hentsch & Cie in Geneva, but they did not take on managing the firms that their father had founded in Paris. In 1854, one of Henri Hentsch's grandsons, Jean-Alexis Henri Hentsch (aged 36) left for the Western United States, after twelve years as the head of the family bank in Geneva. The management of the bank was entrusted to his brother. Jean-Alexis Henri Hentsch eventually settled down in San Francisco, at the time of the Gold rush. He opened a bank there, which he named Hentsch & Cie. The business was a success. He was named honorary consul of Switzerland in San Francisco in 1859, and then returned to Geneva in 1873, where he founded the Swiss American Bank, which would then become the parent company of the bank Hentsch & Cie in San Francisco (unrelated to what is now the Lombard Odier group).

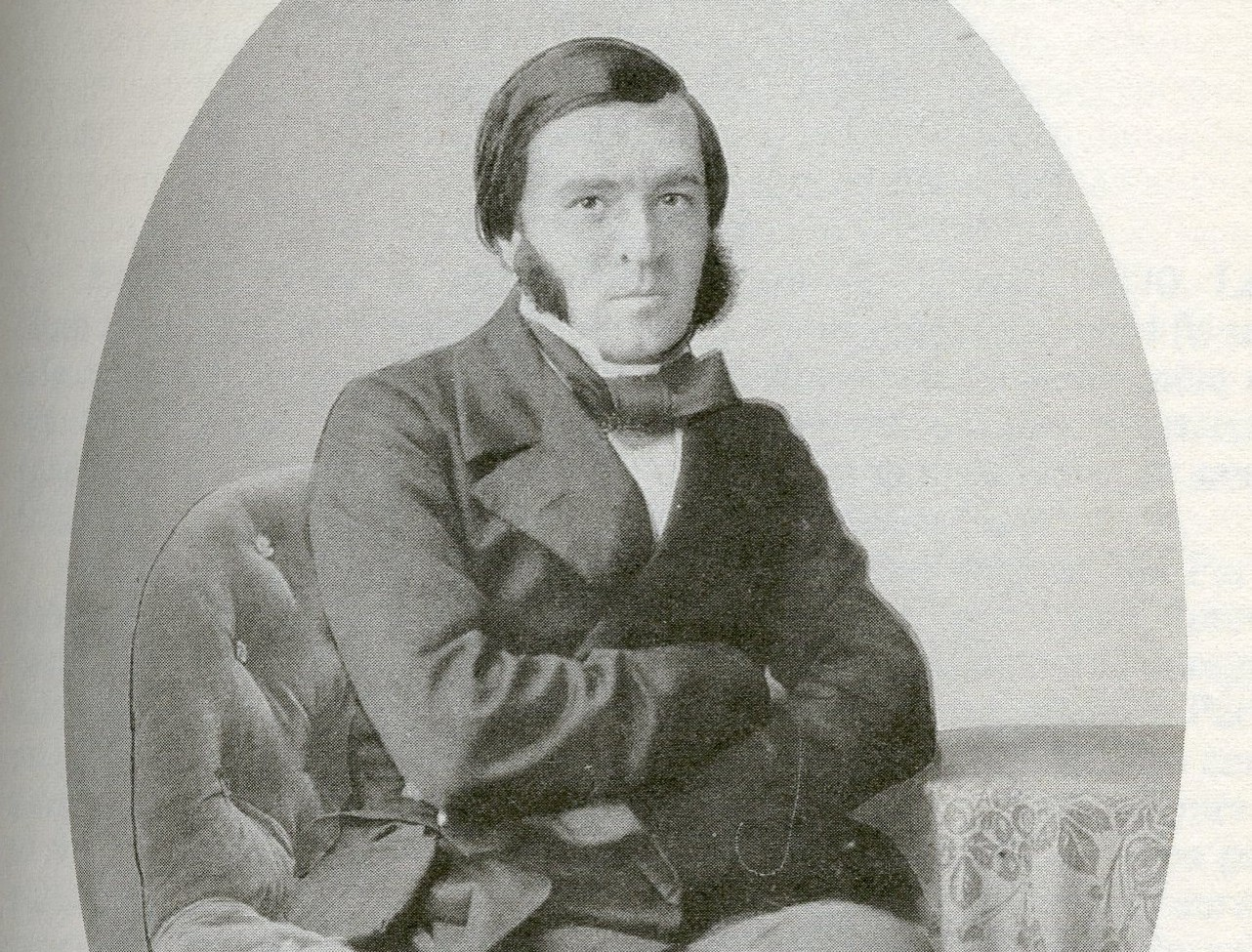
Édouard Hentsch (1829–1892)

In 1854, Édouard Hentsch (the grandson of Henri Hentsch) resumed managing of the bank Mathieu, Hentsch & Cie in Paris. He enjoyed a high-ranking career in finance, later becoming the president of the bank Comptoir national d'escompte de Paris, and then the Banque de l'Indochine, before founding the Swiss railways bank (Banque des Chemins de fer suisses). He died in 1892, bankrupted by the crash of the copper trade in 1889, which caused the bank Comptoir national d’escompte de Paris to struggle with increasingly high repayments on his personal fortune. Away from this turmoil, the bank Hentsch & Cie continued its operations in Geneva and was passed down the family for several generations. In the 1950s, under the management of Léonard Hentsch, the bank Hentsch & Cie became a pioneer in the distribution of investment funds in Switzerland.

In 1837, Jean-François Chaponnière founded the bank Chaponnière & Cie in Geneva, which then became the bank Darier, Chaponnière & Cie in 1876, during the time when Jules Darier-Rey became a partner. This then became Darier & Cie in 1880. The bank specialised in commercial business and the transport sector. Before becoming a partner at the bank, in 1872 Jules Darier-Rey co-founded the first life insurance company in Geneva, La Genevoise, with James Odier. As with the bank Hentsch & Cie, Darier & Cie was passed down through the family for several generations. One of the first merger projects between Hentsch & Cie and Darier & Cie was planned in 1971 by the Hentsch bank, but did not succeed then. The merger finally happened on 1 January 1991, producing the bank Darier, Hentsch & Cie. The newspaper Le Temps claimed that "those who knew the project well spoke just as much about it as an absorption of Hentsch by Darier, as they did a merger between equals".

=== Historical collaborations (1840–1933) ===
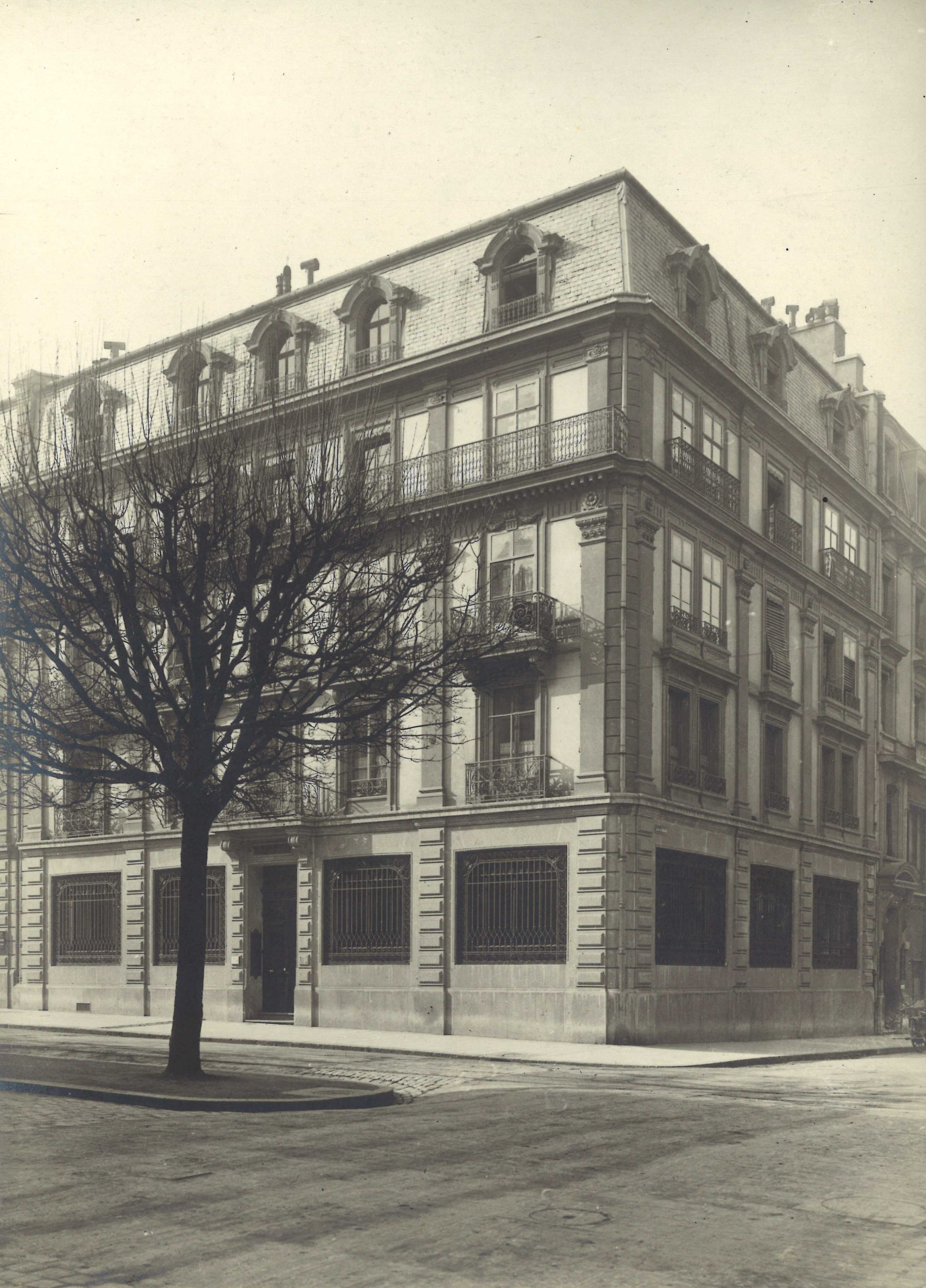
Lombard Odier HQ at 4 boulevard du Théâtre in Geneva (1918)

Throughout their independent existence, the banks Lombard, Odier & Cie, Hentsch & Cie, and Darier & Cie were led to collaborate several times. In 1840, at a time when the Industrial Revolution needed large scale funding but wasn't able to be insured by a single financial firm, the banks Lombard, Odier & Cie, Hentsch & Cie, Candolle Turrettini & Cie, and Louis Pictet & Cie partnered together to form the 'Quatuor', which invested particularly in European railways, in the mines in the Loire Valley region of France, and even in Piedmont loans. In 1872, Quatuor merged with Omnium, another private banking association in Geneva founded in 1849, regrouping Paccard, Ador & Cie, P.F. Bonna & Cie, as well as Ph. Roget & Fils. Together, these firms partnered with the new Banque de Paris et des Pays-Bas to create the Finance Association of Geneva, with the aim of collecting enough capital to conduct financial operations in Switzerland and abroad. Following this, the Financial Union of Geneva was created in 1890, coming out of the merger of the Financial Association of Geneva, and the railways bank La Banque Nouvelle des Chemins de Fer. The financial union, starting out with CHF 12 million in capital, consolidated twelve private banks including Hentsch & Cie, Lombard, Odier & Cie and Darier & Cie. It also played an important role in the world of Genevan finance from 1890 to 1933, in funding large infrastructure projects in Europe and the US. According to Bauer and Mottet (1986), this collaboration between Genevan private banks would be at the heart of their sustainability.

=== Lombard Odier Group ===
In the summer of 2002, Lombard, Odier & Cie merged with Darier, Hentsch & Cie, creating the partnership Lombard, Odier, Darier, Hentsch & Cie. The merger resulted in one of the most significant private banks in Switzerland, totalling 20 branches abroad, 2,000 employees, and EUR 95 billion in managed assets. The merger was accompanied by a cost and workforce reduction plan, at a difficult time made even harsher by the fall of the stock market following the eruption of the dot-com bubble.

In 2006, Lombard, Odier, Darier, Hentsch & Cie joined the Henokiens, an association which brings together family-owned businesses with over 200 years of history. The descendants of the four historical families, Thierry Lombard, Patrick Odier, Pierre Darier and Christophe Hentsch were included in the bank's partners until the departure of Pierre Darier in 2010. Some time later, the firm simplified its corporate name and became the Compagnie Lombard, Odier & Cie.

In December 2013, Lombard Odier enrolled into the voluntary programme for open negotiations run by the United States Department of Justice, to regularise cases of tax noncompliance by American taxpayers within its client base. On 31 December 2015, the Lombard Odier bank announced that it had come to an agreement with the DOJ, which consisted of a US$99.8 million payout to settle the disputes linked to tax noncompliance.

The firm changed its legal structure on 1 January 2014, becoming a private company limited by shares, abandoning its status as a partnership, which held the partners responsible for their own personal assets indefinitely. This change of status also meant that the bank was henceforth obliged to publish its half-year and annual accounts. The banks Pictet, Mirabaud and Gonet simultaneously or shortly after adopted the same status, responding to the needs for transparency, regulatory demands, and limitation of risks, following the closure of the private bank Wegelin & Co. as part of a dispute with the United States Department of Justice. After losing its status as a partnership, the Lombard Odier Group considered itself obliged to leave the Association of Swiss Private Bankers, which dictated that its members hold this status.

Thierry Lombard retired at the end of 2014, and his son Alexis Lombard left the firm in April 2016, joining the board of directors of Landolt & Cie in Lausanne.

In December 2016, the Swiss Public Ministry launched a criminal enquiry into the activities of the private bank Lombard, Odier & Cie for suspected money laundering within the social circle of Gulnara Karimova, the daughter of the former Uzbek president. It was claimed that the bank did not take "all reasonable and necessary organisational measures", as the Swiss penal code requires. The bank stated that it had reported these money laundering activities to the authorities.

On 31 December 2016, Anne-Marie de Weck, associate manager of the bank since 2002, retired, but continued to sit on the administrative board). Annika Falkengren, ex-Executive Director of Skandinaviska Enskilda Banken (SEB), succeeded her a few months later, and joined as a managing partner of the firm from July 2017 until the end of 2023. At the same time as her appointment, the Lombard Odier Group announced the promotion of Denis Pittet to Managing Partner, followed by the appointment of Alexandre Meyer as her successor. At the end of 2024, Alexandre Zeller decided to retire. He was succeeded by Xavier Bonna, who assumed his duties on 1 January 2025.

As of 1 January 2026, the Group had six managing partners.

== Operations ==
=== Wealth management ===
The Lombard Odier Group's historic activity lies in wealth management for a private client base (a private banking operation). This operation covers most notably the provision of asset management advice, financial investment advice, tax advice, and estate planning. The wealth management operations are mostly overseen in Geneva, at the Lombard, Odier & Cie SA bank, as one of the companies held by the holding company of the Lombard Odier Group.

=== Asset management ===
Lombard Odier is just as present in the field of asset management; it has several branches, the leading of which being the management corporation Lombard Odier Asset Management (Europe) Limited, based in London. This firm makes use of the Lombard Odier Investment Managers (Lombard Odier IM) brand, by which the Group is known in the international sphere of asset management. This operation mainly involves the management of investment funds placed into shares and bonds, which is added to by investment from hedge funds. These funds are also accessible for clients of the private bank Lombard, Odier & Cie SA, as well as for an international client base of institutional investors and financial advisers outside of the Lombard Odier Group. The firm is also active in the field of socially responsible investment, most notably in putting forward a range of "impact investing" capital.

Since 2015, the management company Lombard Odier IM has been active in the area of ETF (exchange-traded funds), following its partnership with ETF Securities. The first ETFs from Lombard Odier were launched in April 2015, to replicate the results of indexes on the bond market (government bonds, enterprise bonds, and developing countries bonds).

In 2018, Lombard Odier IM was one of the first management companies to get through a settlement process managed by a private blockchain for the purchase of securities on the bond market.

=== Banking IT services ===
Since 2014, the Lombard Odier Group has been offering back and middle office IT services to other banking firms, through a tool dubbed "G2". This tool allowed users to manage their client base and buy and sell securities on the market. Initially offered to six external institutions, "G2 Pro" turned to another dozen banks as clients. The banking IT operations were trialed in 2016 at a separate company owned by the holding company for the Lombard Odier Group. The bank Lombard, Odier & Cie SA is itself a client of the organisation, in the same way as the external firms that it is able to equip.

== Branches and international presence ==
=== Switzerland ===
The head office of Hentsch & Cie was located in Geneva from its foundation in 1796. The location of the headquarters has, however, moved over the centuries. In 1858, the Hentsch & Cie moved into the rue de la Corraterie in Maison Gallatin (built in 1708). This remains as the oldest head office of the Lombard Odier Group in Geneva. Lombard, Odier & Cie had moved to the neighbouring house the year before. Between 1921 and 1924, the buildings belonging to the banks Hentsch & Cie and Lombard, Odier & Cie situated on the rue de la Corraterie were both rebuilt to allow for extra floors. In 1957, Lombard, Odier & Cie acquired the neighbouring building at 9 rue de la Corraterie. Before this space was inhabited by the bank's staff, it was entirely rebuilt in line with the plans made by the architect Antoine de Saussure. In 1990, all the administrative services for Lombard, Odier & Cie were brought together at a property located in Lancy. Over the years, Lombard, Odier & Cie slowly expanded over the street, buying adjacent houses from its competitors.

In 2025, Lombard Odier relocated its headquarters to Bellevue, into a building designed by Herzog & de Meuron, with Rodolphe Parente responsible for the design of the client areas. Named 1Roof, the building received, shortly after its inauguration, the highest BREEAM certification score ever awarded in Switzerland, while Monocle praised its design and ranked it among the most beautiful buildings of 2026. The new headquarters brought together all of the bank's teams, which had previously been spread across five different sites in the city of Geneva. The firm's historic buildings in the city centre were subsequently sold.

The Lombard Odier Group also has several branches and representative offices throughout Switzerland. The bank has been present in Lausanne since 1882, in Vevey and Zurich since 1989, and in Fribourg since 2008.

=== Europe ===
The Lombard Odier Group owns several European subsidiaries which were combined into one branch which opened in Luxembourg in 2011. The group of subsidiaries of the Lombard Odier in Europe were therefore considered in the legal and financial plan as branches of its Luxembourgish bank.

The Lombard Odier Group has had a London branch since 1973, today leading the asset management operations for the Group. The London branch was historically dedicated to the institutional management operations for Lombard, Odier & Cie, and therefore held the corporate name Lombard, Odier International Portfolio Management Ltd (LOIPM). This firm managed in particular the portfolios of institutional investors in the US and Middle East. Still under British jurisdiction, the group was also present in Gibraltar from 1987.

In France, Lombard Odier has been established in Paris since 2001, with the opening of the Lombard Odier Gestion building, which became LODH Gestion the following year, as Lombard, Odier & Cie merged with Darier, Hentsch & Cie. The aim of the branch was to expand into a French institutional client base, and to further the distribution of investment funds from the Lombard Odier brand. In 2004, the French branch obtained a management mandate for the Pensions Reserve Fund (FRR), then partnered with ADI to launch the firm GéA in France, specialising in hedge funds. The partnership ended in October 2008, and Lombard Odier launched its own office specialising in hedge funds, complementing its specialist offices for bondholder investments, asset allocation and socially responsible investing.

The Lombard Odier Group has been present in Brussels since 2004, in Madrid and Frankfurt since 2007, and in Milan since 2016.

=== Americas ===
The Lombard Odier Group has been present in North America since 1951, when Lombard, Odier & Cie opened its first international abroad, in Montreal, Canada. This branch, initially created under the name Secfin Company Ltd, now bears the name Lombard Odier Securities (Canada) Inc. The Group has been present In the US since 1972, when Lombard, Odier & Cie launched a subsidiary named Lombard, Odier Inc., which has now become Lombard Odier Asset Management (USA) Corp. Upon launching, the only aim of Lombard, Odier Inc. was to relay information from the American side to Geneva, but quickly expanded to secure seats at the Boston (1969) and New York Stock Exchanges (1979).

The Lombard Odier Group has also been present in Bermuda since 1992 and Nassau since 1979. As for Latin America, the Group has been present in Panama City since 2013.

=== Asia, Middle East, and Africa ===
In Asia, Lombard Odier has been active in Hong Kong since 1987, Tokyo since 1992, and Singapore since 2017. The Group has also had a cooperation agreement in place with Industrial Bank in China since 2014.

Lastly, the Group has had offices in Dubai as well as Tel Aviv and Johannesburg.

== Philanthropy ==
The tradition of banking families engaging in philanthropic or humanitarian causes originates in the 19th century. Alexandre Lombard in his time participated in a supporting committee aiming to raise money to help those injured in the Second Italian War of Independence. This came in response to the appeal from Henry Dunant, an initiative which would lead to the founding of the Red Cross in 1863. His son, Alexis Lombard, was a member of the administration committee at the General Hospice of Geneva for 38 years, assuming presidency of the institution eleven times between 1876 and 1900. In 1910 and 1918, the banks Lombard, Odier & Cie and Hentsch & Cie were both among the first Swiss companies to secure a retirement plan for their employees through pension funds, which would be absorbed by Swiss retirement provision in 1947, which had just been established.

The Lombard Odier Group has two philanthropic foundations: the Lombard Odier Foundation, a business foundation funded by donations from the Lombard Odier Group, and the Philanthropia Foundation, targeted at donations from private banking clients.

The Lombard Odier Foundation distributes between 1 and 1.5 million Swiss francs a year, mostly to projects in areas of education and humanitarian works. The foundation has been chaired by Patrick Odier since 2016. In 2020, the foundation endowed the Lombard Odier associate professorship in Sustainable Finance at Oxford University stating, "The multi-year partnership will create the first endowed professorship of sustainable finance at any major global research university". The first holder of the position is Dr. Ben Caldecott.

The Philanthropia foundation, created in 2008, invites clients of the bank to make donations for philanthropic work in five main areas: humanitarian and social, education and training, medical and scientific research, environment and sustainable development, and art and culture. To mark its 10th anniversary in 2018, the foundation announced that it had received a total sum of donations totalling CHF 116 million, and had given away every year an average of 10% of its assets to some 100 organisations (for a total of CHF 59 million, 15 million of which went to organisations for cancer research and prevention). The Philanthropia foundation has been chaired by Denis Pittet since 2016.

== See also ==
- Banking in Switzerland
- Economy of Switzerland
