= John Collins (mathematician) =

English mathematician

John Collins FRS (25 March 1625 – 10 November 1683) was an English mathematician. He is most known for his extensive correspondence with leading scientists and mathematicians such as Giovanni Alfonso Borelli, Gottfried Leibniz, Isaac Newton, and John Wallis. His correspondence provides details of many of the discoveries and developments made in his time, and shows his role in making some of these discoveries available to a wider audience. He was called "English Mersenne" for his extensive collecting and diffusing of scientific information.

== Life ==
He was the son of a nonconformist minister, and was born at Wood Eaton in Oxfordshire, 5 March 1625. Apprenticed at the age of sixteen to Thomas Allam, a bookseller, living outside the Turl Gate of Oxford, he was driven to quit the trade by the troubles of the time, and accepted a clerkship in the employment of John Marr, clerk of the kitchen to the Prince of Wales. From him he derived some instruction in mathematics, but the outbreak of the First English Civil War drove him to sea for seven years, 1642-1649, most of which time he spent on board an English merchantman, engaged by the Venetians as a ship of war in their defence of Candia against the Turks.

He devoted his leisure to the study of mathematics and merchants' accounts, and on leaving the service set up in London as a teacher. In 1652 he published An Introduction to Merchants' Accounts, originally drawn up for the use of his scholars. Reprinted in 1665, the major part of the impression perished in the Great Fire of London, but was replaced in 1674 by a new and amplified folio edition. He next wrote The Sector on a Quadrant, or a Treatise containing the Description and Use of three several Quadrants. Also an appendix touching Reflected Dyalling, from a Glass however posited (London, 1658); and The Description and Uses of a general Quadrant, with the Horizontal Projection upon it Inverted (1658). In 1659 appeared his Geometricall Dyalling, or Dyalling performed by a Line of Chords only, and The Mariner's Plain Scale new Plained, a treatise on navigation for the East India Company's navy. It was well received, and became a class-book with the students of navigation at Christ Church Hospital.

After the Restoration, Collins was appointed successively accountant to the excise office, accountant in chancery, and secretary to the council of plantations, exchanging the last post in 1672 for that of manager of the farthing office. With this employment went a house in Fenchurch Street, where he had thoughts of setting up a stationer's shop, and hoped 'to fall into the printing of books,' including some he himself designed to write, 'particularly one of the modern advancement of mathematical sciences, and an account of the best authors of that kind'. He did not, however, succeed in carrying the plan into effect. With the failure of his arguments against the issue of tin farthings his office ceased, and he was glad subsequently to accept a small post as accountant to the Royal Fishery Company.

He had refused in March 1669 a situation offered to him in Ireland by the surveyor-general, Sir James Shaen, and about the same time married one of two daughters of William Austen, head cook to Charles II. As his family increased his means of subsistence became more and more precarious. He undertook accountancy work, spending less time on learned correspondence.

Several of his writings testify to his acquaintance with the course of trade and interest in public matters. He published in 1680 A Plea for the bringing in of Irish Cattel, and keeping out Fish caught by Foreigners, together with an humble Address to the Honourable members of parliament of the counties of Cornwall and Devon, about the Advancement of Tin, Fishery, and divers Manufactures; and in 1682 a little treatise entitled Salt and Fishery, in which he dwelt upon the several modes of preparing salt in England and abroad, the catching of fish, the salting and cooking of fish and meat, besides offering proposals for the relief of the salt-workers.

Collins died, 10 November 1683, at his lodging on Garlick Hill, London, of asthma and consumption, and was buried in the parish church of St. James.

== Works ==
An enlarged edition of his Doctrine of Decimal Arithmetick, the preparation of which had engaged his attention during about a year before his death, appeared in 1685. It had originally been printed in 1664 on a quarter of a sheet for portability in a letter-case. His Arithmetic in whole Numbers and Fractions, both Vulgar and Decimal, with Tables for the Forbearance and Rebate of Money, &c., was published by Thomas Plant in 1688.

Collins was elected a fellow of the Royal Society 24 October 1667, and on 11 November of that year communicated an exposition of a theorem by the Jesuit Jacques de Billy. He contributed further An Account concerning the Resolution of Equations in Numbers, a survey of recent algebra improvements made in England, and A Solution of a Chorographical Problem; while a letter written to John Wallis, 3 October 1682, was imparted to the society 20 May 1684. This was designed as preliminary to a formal treatise on algebra, never written.

He helped forward many important publications. To him was due the printing of Isaac Barrow's Optical and Geometrical Lectures, as well as of his editions of Apollonius and Archimedes; of John Kersey's Algebra, Thomas Branker's translation of Rhonius's Algebra, and Wallis's History of Algebra. He took an active part in seeing Jeremiah Horrocks's Astronomical Remains through the press.

== Legacy ==
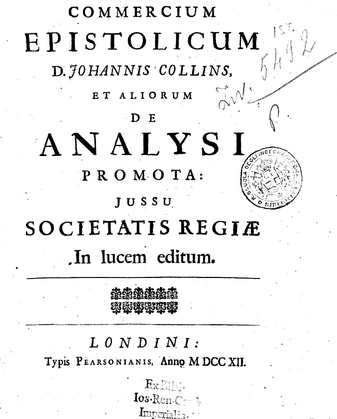

About twenty-five years after Collins's death his books and papers came into the possession of William Jones, F.R.S. They included a voluminous correspondence with Newton, Leibniz, Gregory, Barrow, John Flamsteed, Wallis, Slusius, and others. From it was selected and published in 1712, by order of the Royal Society, the Commercium Epistolicum, of material relevant to Newton's priority over Leibniz in the discovery of the infinitesimal calculus; specimens of results from the use of the fluxional method were transmitted 20 July 1669 through Barrow to Collins, and by him made widely known.
