= Bordier & Cie =

Swiss independent private bankers

Coordinates: 46.2023°N 6.1424°E

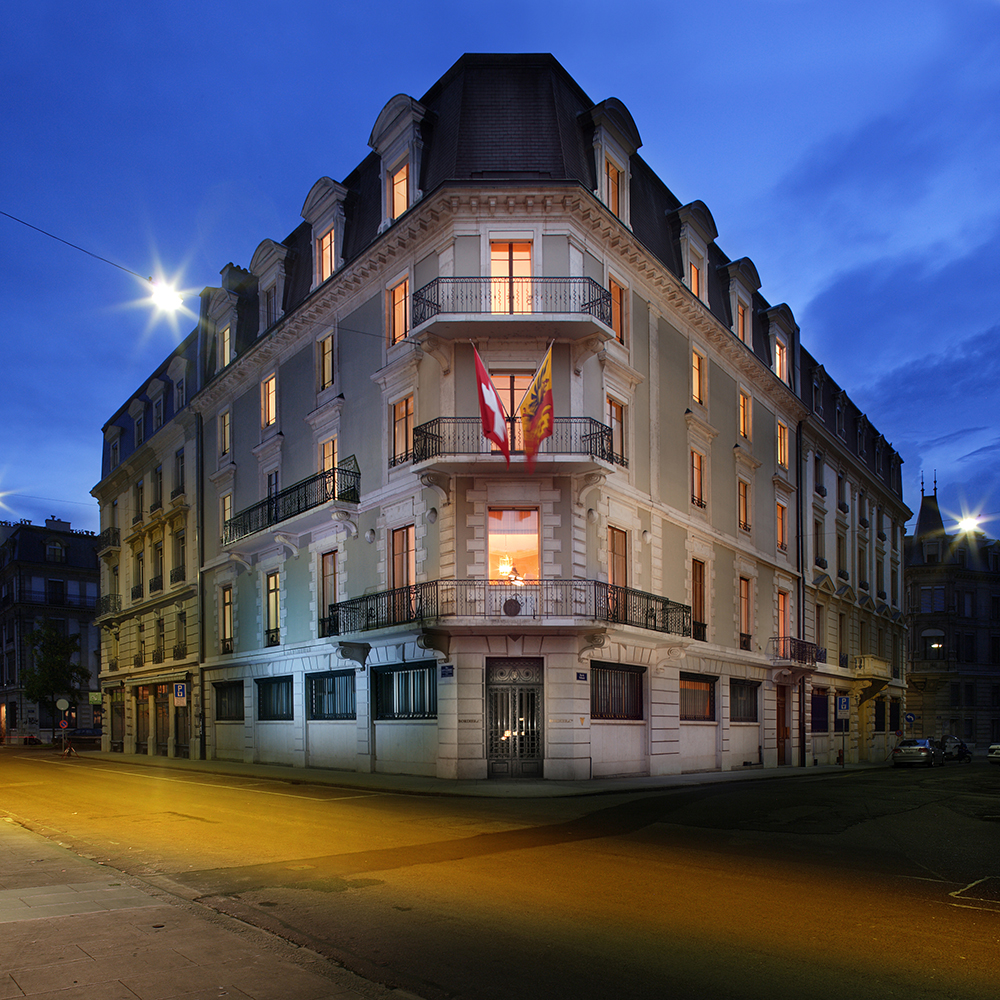
- Bordier's headquarters in Geneva
- Type: Partnership limited by shares
- Industry: Private banking, wealth management
- Founded: 1844; 182 years ago
- Headquarters: Geneva
- Number of locations: 12
- Area served: Worldwide
- AUM: CHF 22bn (June 2026)
- Number of employees: 320 (2025)
- Website: Bordier & Cie

Bordier & Cie is a Swiss private banker founded in 1844 in Geneva and active in wealth management for private clients. It is the last French-speaking private banker in Switzerland, headed by three partners with unlimited responsibility on their own assets. The institution holds a banking license in Switzerland, Turks and Caicos Islands and Singapore and has branches in the United Kingdom, France and Uruguay.

== History ==
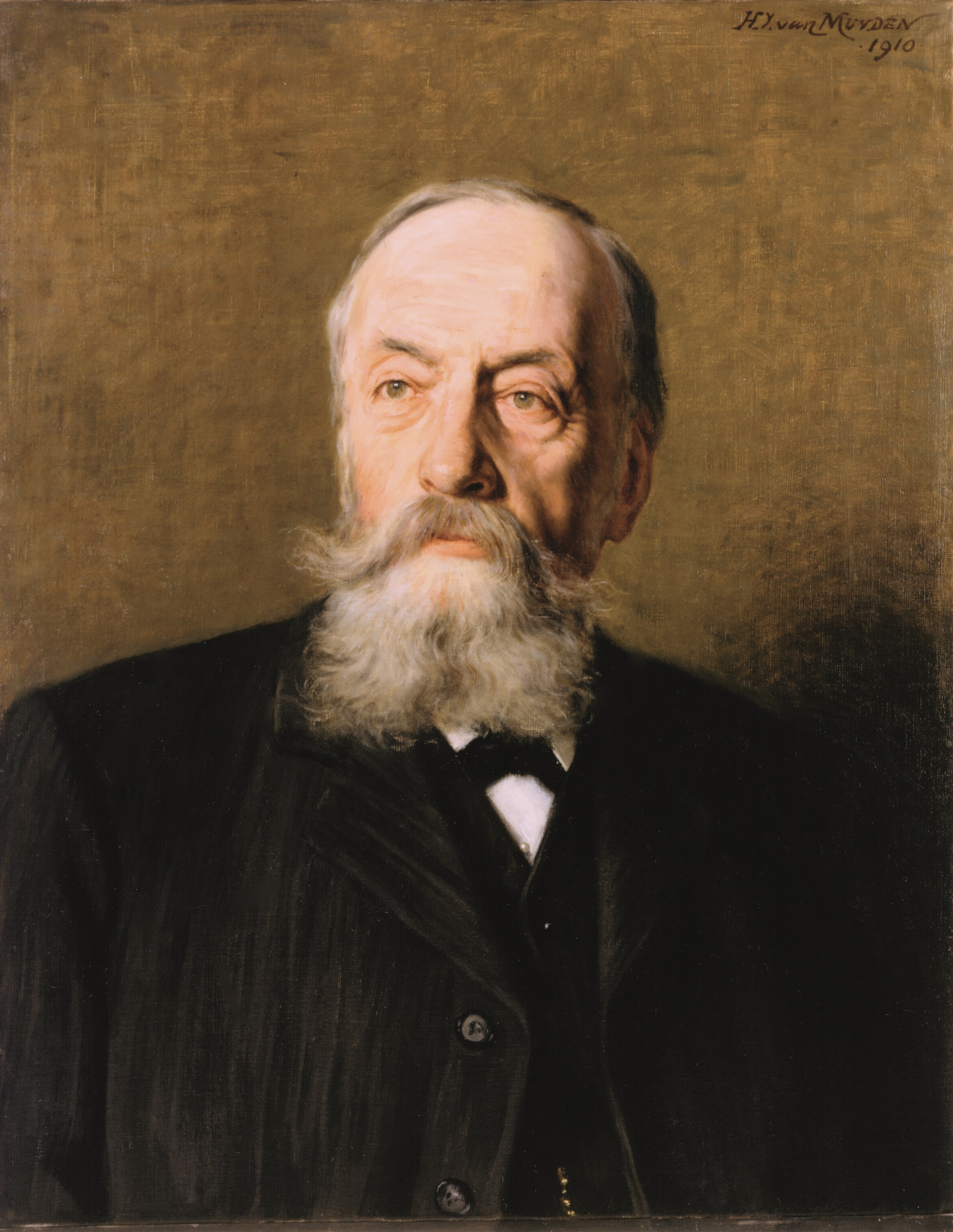
Ami Bordier, the founder of Bordier & Cie, depicted in 1910

The Bordier bank was founded in 1844 when Jaques Reverdin, who was previously employed at the Pictet bank, started the company to become a banker in Geneva. In 1871, Reverdin's son-in-law Ami Bordier joined the company as a business broker. Upon Reverdin's death in 1895 the management of the bank was given to Bordier and the institution was renamed Bordier & Cie.

Ami Bordier was joined by his two sons, Pierre and Édouard, in 1897 and 1904 respectively. In 1906, the institution relocated to number 16 rue de Hollande in Geneva, where its headquarters are located today. In 1917, Ami Bordier retired and his sons became the bank's managers. Guillaume and Jacques Bordier, Pierre's sons, became partners in 1936 and Raymond, Pierre's third son, and Edmond Bordier, Édouard's only son, joined in 1938. In 1966, Philippe Bordier, Jacques’ oldest son, and André Bordier, Guillaume's son, joined the bank as partners and in 1974 they were at the head of the bank.

In 1975 the bank used an IBM system to computerize and automate their banking system. The bank later adopter the Olympic software at the end of the 1980s, which allowed staff to manage clients’ accounts online.

In 1992, Pierre Poncet became a partner, the first time someone outside of the Bordier family occupied this position. Gaétan Bordier joined the bank in 1994, becoming the fifth generation to join the institution. Grégoire and Evrard, also from the fifth generation, joined as unlimited partners in 1997 and 2011, respectively. In 2012 Michel Juvet replaced Pierre Poncet as managing partner with unlimited liability. In 2020, Christian Skaanild is in turn appointed as a general partner, while Juvet leaves his management position to become a limited partner. In 2026, Nicolas Porchet was appointed a partner with unlimited liability, effective September 15, 2026.

In 2020, the Bordier bank changed its legal status to a partnership limited by shares. The institution maintained its status of “private banker”, the last in Romandie and thus the only French-speaking bank in Switzerland to maintain this particular structure with unlimited liability on the managing partners' private assets.

== Operations ==
Bordier & Cie is headquartered in Geneva with branch offices in Nyon, Bern and Zurich. Outside of Switzerland it has branches in Paris, Brest, Rennes, London, Providenciales in the Turks and Caicos Islands, Montevideo in Uruguay and Singapore. It is a member of the Swiss Private Bankers Association.

Bordier & Cie operates as private bankers. Their services focus on wealth management including tax advice, financial planning, and family services, with approximately CHF 22 bn in assets under management as of 30 June 2026.

== Subsidiaries and partnerships ==
In 2001 Bordier & Cie acquired a 45% share of Berry Asset Management, a private management firm in the United Kingdom. It became a majority shareholder in 2007 when it increased its share to 90% of the company. In 2007 the company expanded in to Uruguay and in 2018 purchased Helvetia Advisors, a consultancy firm. The bank opened in Paris in 2006 under the Bordier & Cie (France) S.A. subsidiary and opened regional offices in Brest and Rennes in 2017.

Bordier & Cie opened a branch in Singapore in 2011. The bank partnered with Military Commercial Joint Stock Bank in Vietnam in 2018 and they created a joint venture in 2020.

In Switzerland, the bank opened a branch in Lausanne in 2025.
