= Rahm =

Rahm may refer to:

- Rahm (name), given name and surname, includes list of people with the name
- Rahm (film), 2016 Pakistani film based on William Shakespeare's play Measure for Measure
- Rahm, a pre-Islamic Arabian deity
- Rahm, Inc., the parent company of Real American Beer

== See also ==
- Rahim, one of the names of Allah in Islam
