= Rahme =

Rahme is a given name and surname. Notable people with the name include:

== Given name ==
- Rahme Haider (1886 – after 1935), Syrian-born educator

== Surname ==
- Cheyne Rahme (born 1991), South African track and field athlete
- Daniella Rahme (born 1990), Lebanese actress and TV presenter
- Emile Rahme, Lebanese Maronite
- Hanna Rahmé (born 1960), Lebanese Maronites
- Joseph Rahme (born 1971), tennis player
- Laurence Rahme, Lebanese medical professor
- Laurice Rahmé, businesswoman
- Michel Rahme, Lebanese alpine skier
- Raymond Rahme (born 1945), South African poker player
- Rudy Rahme (born 1967), Lebanese sculptor and painter

== See also ==
- Rahm (name), given name and surname
- Basel Abbas and Ruanne Abou-Rahme, artist duo
