= Rahn family =

Bourgeois family of Zurich

- Bourgeois family
- Country: Switzerland
- Current region: Zurich
- Origin: Rorbas
- Founded: 1429 (citizenship of Zurich)
- Founder: Hans Rahn (died 1451)
- Members: Hans Rudolf Rahn and his sons Hans Heinrich and Hans Rudolf, mayors; Johann Heinrich Rahn; David Rahn, physician; Johann Heinrich Rahn, physician; Johann Rudolf Rahn, scholar; Hartmann Rahn, merchant
- Estates: Sünikon (lower jurisdiction, from 1602); Susenberg (small castle), Zürichberg

The Rahn family is a bourgeois family (Bürgerfamilie) of Zurich, citizens of the city since 1429. From the 16th century the Rahns sat in the city's Grand and Small Councils, where only two other families outnumbered them, and at the beginning of the 17th century they dominated Zurich politics with three mayors. Members of the family who were not in state service were craftsmen, manufacturers, merchants, scholars or clergymen, or entered military service. From 1882 the Rahns held a share in a Zurich private bank, which has traded as Rahn & Bodmer since the 1920s.

== History ==
The family's progenitor, Hans (died 1451), an innkeeper from Rorbas, acquired citizenship of Zurich in 1429. The Rahns were represented in the councils, where only the Meyer von Knonau and the Escher vom Glas outnumbered them. From 1513 they sat 30 times in the Grand Council for the guilds zur Meisen, zur Gerwe and zum Widder (from the 17th century mainly for the last of these), and from 1532 they sat 13 times in the Small Council. At the beginning of the 17th century they dominated Zurich politics with three mayors: Hans Rudolf and his two sons Hans Heinrich and Hans Rudolf. They also provided 13 bailiffs (Landvögte). The members of the family who were not in state service were craftsmen, manufacturers, merchants, rentiers, scholars or clergymen, or entered military service. They belonged to the Schildner zum Schneggen from 1568, and in the 17th century the Rahns held three of its shields (Schilder).

With the sons of mayor Hans Rudolf the family split into two lines. The line of Hans Jakob (1601–1679), which died out in the 18th century, held the lower jurisdiction (Gerichtsherrschaft) of Sünikon for about a century from 1602 and was active mainly in state and military service. The second line, founded by mayor Hans Heinrich, split into three branches: the craftsmen's line of Hans Conrad (1616–1676), which died out at the beginning of the 19th century; the line of Hans Rudolf (1617–1656), which until the 18th century produced mainly craftsmen and then merchants and clergymen; and the line of Hans Heinrich. Until the end of the 18th century the members of this last line were active mainly in state and military service, and from the 18th century also as clergymen, physicians (David, Johann Heinrich), scholars (for example Johann Rudolf) and merchants (Hartmann).

From 1882 the Rahns held a share in a Zurich private bank that has traded as Rahn & Bodmer since the 1920s. Besides town houses, the family owned the small castle (Schlösschen) of Susenberg on the Zürichberg. In 1669 a family fund was set up from the estate of mayor Hans Heinrich.

== Bibliography ==
- Schweizerisches Geschlechterbuch, vol. 1, pp. 432–436; vol. 6, pp. 538–548
- W. Schnyder-Spross, Die Familie Rahn von Zürich, 1951
