= Rahming =

Rahming is a surname of Bahamian origin.

== People with the surname ==
- Christopher Rahming, Bahamian footballer
- Elliston Rahming, Bahamian diplomat
- Franklin Rahming, Bahamian sprinter
- Latrae Rahming, Bahamian politician
- Lisa Rahming, Bahamian politician
- Reuben Rahming (born 1970), Bahamian politician

== See also ==
- Ramming
- Rahm (name)
