= Rahn+Bodmer =

- Native name: Rahn+Bodmer Co.
- Industry: Financial services
- Founded: 1750; 276 years ago
- Headquarters: Münstergasse 2, 8021 Zurich, Switzerland
- Number of employees: about 200
- Website: www.rahnbodmer.ch/en

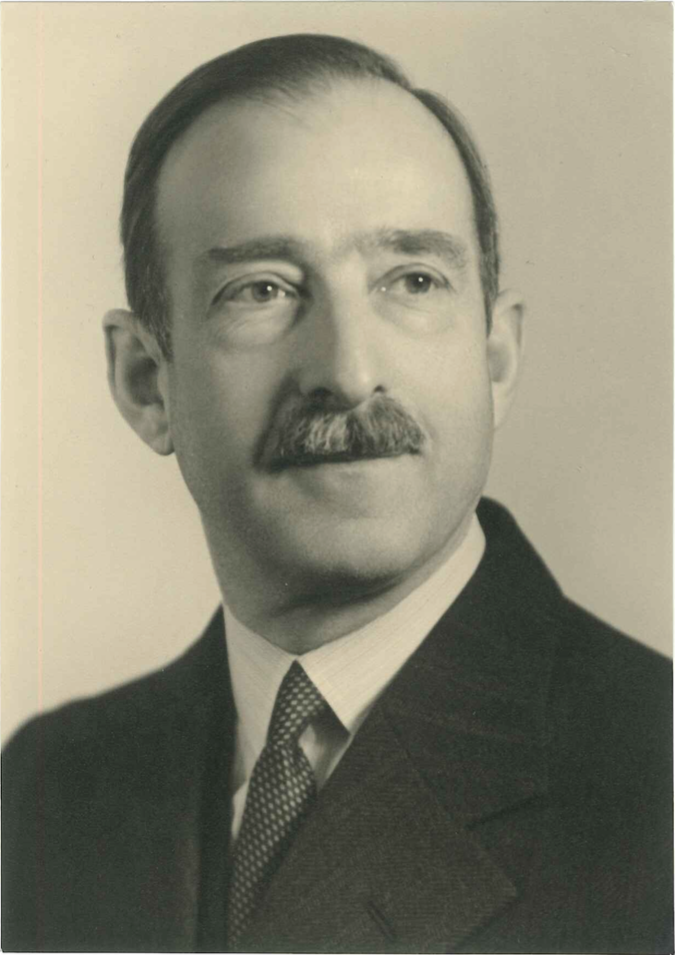
Max Bodmer-Schlindler in 1934, co-owner of the bank and cofounder of the Swiss Private Bankers Association.

Rahn+Bodmer Co. is a Swiss private bank specialized in investment advisory and asset management. The company was founded in Zürich in 1750 as a silk trading house and today is the oldest private bank in Zürich. Its form is a limited partnership now with five liable partners. For several generations the company has been owned by the Zürich families of Rahn, Bodmer and Bidermann.
