= Thomas Branker =

English mathematician

Thomas Branker (Brancker) (1633–1676) was an English mathematician.

== Life ==
He was born at Barnstaple in August 1633, the son of another Thomas Brancker, a graduate of Exeter College, Oxford, who was in 1626 a schoolmaster near Ilchester, and about 1630 head-master of the Barnstaple High School. The family originally bore the name of Brouncker. Young Brancker matriculated at his father's college 8 November 1652; proceeded B.A. 15 June 1655, and was elected a probationer fellow of Exeter 30 June 1655, and full fellow 10 July 1656. After taking his master's degree (22 April 1658), he took to preaching, but he refused to conform to the ceremonies of the church of England, and was deprived of his fellowship 4 June 1663.

He then retired to Cheshire, changed his views, and applied for and obtained episcopal ordination. He became a minister at Whitegate, Cheshire, but his reputation as a mathematician reached William Brereton, 3rd Baron Brereton, who gave him the rectory of Tilston, near Malpas, in 1668. He resigned the benefice after a few months, and became head-master of the grammar school at Macclesfield, where he died in November 1676. He was buried in Macclesfield church, and the inscription on his monument states that he was a linguist as well as a mathematician, chemist, and natural philosopher, and that he pursued studies under Robert Boyle.

Around 1665 he married Hannah Meyrick and had four daughters and two sons. The youngest son, Benjamin, became a gold and silversmith in Liverpool and was the grandfather of Peter Whitfield Brancker, Mayor of Liverpool (1801).

== Works ==
Branker gained his first knowledge of mathematics and chemistry from Peter Sthael of Strasburg, a chemist and Rosicrucian, 'who before 1660 settled in Oxford as a private tutor, at the suggestion of Robert Boyle, and numbered Ralph Bathurst, Christopher Wren, with Branker, Anthony Wood and others among his pupils. Brancker's earliest publication was Doctrinæ Sphæricæ Adumbratio unà cum usu Globorum Artificialium, Oxford, 1662. In 1668 he published a translation of an introduction to algebra from the German of Johann Rahn, and added a factor table for odd numbers up to 100,000. The book was licensed 18 May 1665, but the publication was delayed to enable John Pell to add notes and corrections. John Collins also gave Brancker assistance over the book, and praised it in a letter to James Gregory in 1668. The value of the table and translation is acknowledged in an early paper in the Philosophical Transactions (No. 35, pp. 688–9), and the table and preface were reprinted by Francis Maseres in a volume of mathematical tracts (1795), together with James Bernoulli's Doctrine of Permutations and other papers. Maseres states that John Wallis thought well of Brancker's table, and corrected a few errors in it. A manuscript key to an elaborate cipher in the possession of J. H. Cooke, F.S.A., is attributed to Branker and is described in the Transactions of the Society of Antiquaries for 1877.
