= Annika Falkengren =

Swedish banker

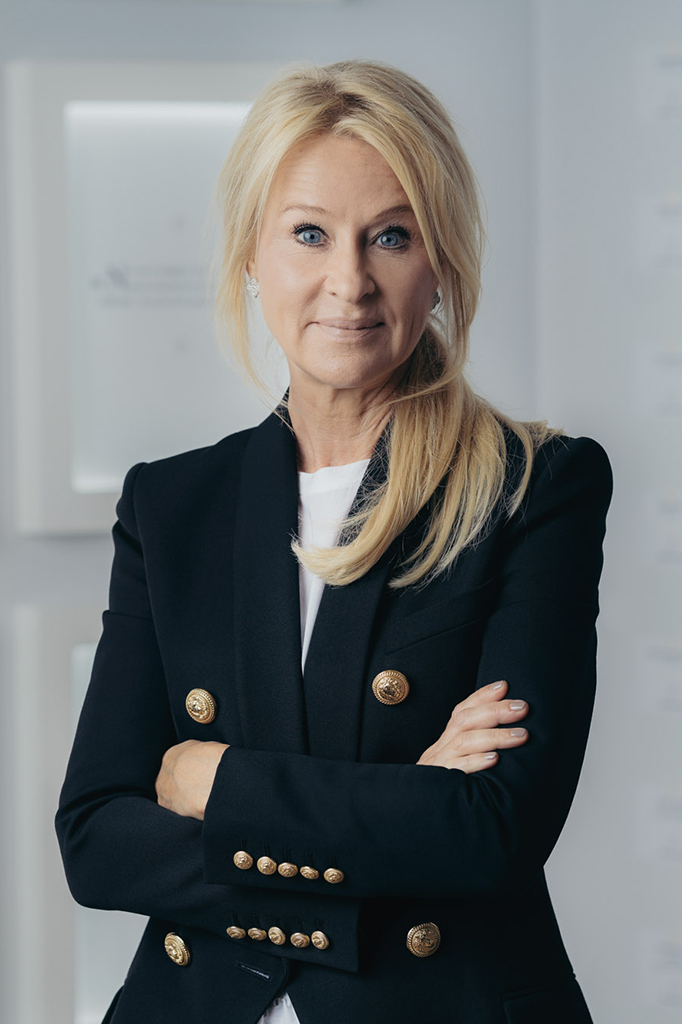
- Born: 12 April 1962 (age 64); Bangkok, Thailand
- Education: 1987 BSc Business Administration and economics, Stockholm University
- Occupation: Managing partner at lombard odier
- Years active: 1987 to present

Annika Falkengren (née Bolin) is a former managing partner at Lombard Odier Group, a position she held from 2017 to 2023. She was president and CEO of Skandinaviska Enskilda Banken (SEB) from 2005 to 2017, having built her early career at SEB.

She has held various board membership positions and received numerous awards, most notably being repeatedly ranked by Fortune Magazine as one of the most powerful women in Global Business.

Annika Falkengren lives in Geneva, Switzerland, with her family.

== Early life and education ==
Annika Falkengren was born on 12 April 1962 in Bangkok where her parents were stationed as diplomats for the Swedish Ministry of Foreign Affairs. She returned to Sweden to pursue her studies at the Sigtunaskolan Humanistiska Läroverket boarding school and following that continued her higher education at Stockholm University, from where she graduated in 1987 with a Bachelor's degree in business administration and Economics.

== Professional life ==
Annika Falkengren joined SEB in 1987 as part of the bank's graduate training program. She progressed through the ranks, holding a number of different roles predominantly in the bank's capital markets business lines before being appointed president and CEO in 2005. She held the position until 2017 when she left SEB to join Lombard Odier as managing partner, a role she held until December 2023.

At Lombard Odier, Annika Falkengren oversaw a number of Group functions including Finance, Risk, Corporate Services and Marketing and Communications. She chaired the Group CSR Committee, and was responsible for the 1Roof project, a new single-site headquarters for the Lombard Odier Group in Geneva.

=== Directorships ===
Annika Falkengren is active on several boards of directors, including Swedish tech lender Ark Capital. Previously she has held a number board level positions, including Chair of the Swedish Bankers' Association; member of the supervisory boards of Munich Re and Volkswagen; and member of the board of directors of Scania, Securitas, FAM and Mentor Sweden.

=== Recognition and awards ===
Repeatedly ranked by ´Fortune as among the 10 most powerful women in business, Annika Falkengren also received in 2012 the European Banker of the Year Award from Euro Finance Group and was named in 2005 and 2013 as one of the most powerful women in Swedish business by Swedish business magazine Veckans Affärer.

In 2016, Annika Falkengren was awarded the Gold Medal of 12th size of the Order of the Seraphim ribbon by the King of Sweden. In addition, in 2014 she received the Lucia Trade Award from the Swedish American Chamber of Commerce and is also a member of the Royal Swedish Academy of Engineering Sciences since 2011.
