= Rahm (name) =

Rahm is a given name and surname. Notable people with the name include:

== Surname ==
The surname has a number of etymologies. As a surname of German and Scandinavian origin, it may be a habitational name from a number of places in Westphalia and the Rhineland, or an occupational name derived from Middle High German rām "soot", or an occupational name from Middle High German rame "stand, rack, frame". The German surname Rähm is a variant of Rehm.

- Bror Yngve Rahm (born 1955), Norwegian politician
- Christina Rahm (c. 1760–1837), Swedish actress and opera singer
- Dave Rahm (1931–1976), Canadian geologist and stunt pilot
- Ilmari Rahm (1888–1938), Finnish chess master
- John Rahm (1854–1935), American golfer
- Jon Rahm (born 1994), Spanish golfer
- Karl Rahm (1907–1947), Austrian-born German SS officer, commandant of the Theresienstadt concentration camp, executed for war crimes
- Kevin Rahm (born 1971), American actor
- Philippe Rahm (born 1967), Swiss architect

== Given name ==
The given name is derived from the Hebrew רחמים (mercy) or רם (high, lofty).

- Rahm Emanuel (born 1959), American politician, former Mayor of Chicago, U.S. ambassador to Japan

== Fictional characters ==
- Rahm Kota, a Jedi who becomes Galen Marek's master in the unfinished Star Wars: The Force Unleashed video game series.

== See also ==
- Rahme, given name and surname
- Rahming, surname
