= Hartmann Rahn =

Swiss merchant (1721–1792)

- Born: 5 November 1721; Zurich, Old Swiss Confederacy
- Died: 29 September 1792 (aged 70); Jena, Holy Roman Empire
- Occupation: Merchant
- Spouse: Johanna Victoria Klopstock
- Parents: Johann Heinrich Rahn (father); Anna Magdalena Steiner (mother)
- Relatives: Friedrich Gottlieb Klopstock (brother-in-law)

Hartmann Rahn (5 November 1721 – 29 September 1792) was a Swiss merchant from Zurich, a member of the Rahn family. In 1752 he opened a silk business in Lyngby near Copenhagen, and he returned to Zurich in 1762. He is regarded as an innovative but unsuccessful entrepreneur.

== Biography ==
Hartmann Rahn was born on 5 November 1721 in Zurich, the son of Johann Heinrich Rahn, a manufacturer (Fabrikant), and Anna Magdalena Steiner. He married Johanna Victoria Klopstock, daughter of Gottlieb Heinrich Klopstock, an advocate of Quedlinburg Abbey (Stiftsadvokat). He was a brother-in-law of Friedrich Gottlieb Klopstock.

Rahn worked as a merchant and belonged to the Widder guild (Widderzunft). In 1752, thanks to the patronage of the Danish king, he opened a silk business in Lyngby near Copenhagen. After business went badly, he returned to Zurich in 1762. There he worked as weighmaster (Waagmeister) at the Kaufhaus (merchandise hall) in 1786.

Rahn is regarded as an innovative but unsuccessful entrepreneur. He invented a method of fabric printing (Zeugdruck) that replaced painting on silk. He died in Jena on 29 September 1792.

== Bibliography ==
- W. Schnyder-Spross, Die Familie Rahn von Zürich, 1951
