= David Rahn =

Swiss physician (1769–1848)

- Line engraving by H. R. Rahn, 1857
- Born: 17 October 1769; Zurich, Old Swiss Confederacy
- Died: 3 December 1848 (aged 79); Zurich, Switzerland
- Occupation: Physician
- Spouses: Anna Escher; Maria Hirzel
- Parents: Johann Conrad Rahn (father); Anna Barbara von Wyss (mother)

David Rahn (17 October 1769 – 3 December 1848) was a Swiss physician from Zurich, a member of the Rahn family. He taught pathology and therapy at the medical-surgical institute in Zurich from 1795, was second state physician (Poliater) from 1803 and first state physician (archiater) from 1817 to 1832, and sat on the health council from 1803 to 1835.

== Biography ==
David Rahn was born on 17 October 1769 in Zurich, the son of Johann Conrad Rahn, a hospital administrator (Spitalpfleger), and Anna Barbara von Wyss. He married first Anna Escher and secondly Maria Hirzel.

In 1791 Rahn obtained his doctorate in medicine in Halle, and he practiced as a physician in Zurich. In 1795 he became a teacher of pathology and therapy at the medical-surgical institute (medizinisch-chirurgisches Institut). In 1803 he became second state physician (Poliater), and from 1817 to 1832 he was first state physician (archiater). From 1803 to 1835 he was a member of the health council (Gesundheitsrat).

Rahn was also a member of the Grand Council, of the education council (Erziehungsrat) and of the church council (Kirchenrat), and in 1832 of the city school council. He died in Zurich on 3 December 1848.

== Bibliography ==
- Zürcher Spitalgeschichte, 1, 1951, 54–56
- W. Schnyder, Die Familie Rahn von Zürich, 1951
