= Laurence Rahme =

American microbiologist

Laurence G. Rahme
- Born: Bsharri, Lebanon
- Education: University of Naples, Italy (BSc in Biology); Institute of Genetics and Biophysics CNR, University of Naples, Italy (MS in Molecular Genetics); University of California at Berkeley (PhD in Microbiology); Massachusetts General Hospital and Harvard Medical School (post-doctoral fellowship)
- Known for: Antivirulence drugs, alternatives to antibiotics
- Awards: American Academy of Microbiology Fellow (2017)
- Scientific career
- Fields: Microbiology, molecular genetics, immunology, molecular biology
- Workplaces: Massachusetts General Hospital and Harvard Medical School (1992-present); Shriners Hospitals for Children (1997-present)

Laurence G. Rahme is an American microbiologist who is Professor of Surgery and Microbiology at Harvard Medical School (HMS). At Massachusetts General Hospital (MGH) she also holds the title of Director of the Molecular Surgical Laboratory as a microbiologist in the Department of Surgery and Molecular Biology. Additionally, she holds a Senior Scientific Staff position at Shriners Hospitals for Children-Boston.

== Early life and education ==
She received her BSc from the University of Naples, Italy, her MS from the Institute of Genetics and Biophysics CNR, University of Naples, Italy, and her PhD from the University of California at Berkeley. She completed her postdoctoral training at the Department of Molecular Biology Massachusetts General Hospital/ and Department of Genetics Harvard Medical School. She was also awarded an honorary MS degree from Harvard Medical School.

== Research ==
Rahme is best known for her pioneering work on Pseudomonas aeruginosa, demonstrating for the first time that this bacterium shares a subset of virulence factors required for the full expression of pathogenicity in both plants and animals, and for the identification of a quorum sensing (QS) system in the organism. Using plants as a model host to study Pseudomonas aeruginosa pathogenicity led her and her colleagues to develop multi-host model systems for the identification of virulence factors in bacteria in a high throughput manner. Researchers studying the human opportunistic pathogen Pseudomonas aeruginosa in the laboratory setting internationally today often use the multi-host infection models developed using the "PA14" strain she identified as a model strain

Using her established system, she discovered that the multiple virulence factor regulator (MvfR) is a key regulator of bacterial quorum-sensing signaling and pathogenesis in various host organisms. Based on these findings, she works on the development of anti-virulence drugs as an alternative or adjunct to antibiotics and co-founded in 2014 Spero Therapeutics in Cambridge, Massachusetts. Her work in host-pathogen interactions continues to inspire researchers in developing novel ways to fight infections. Her group efforts in developing prognostic biomarkers for the identification of patients at high risk for multiple infections is expected to open new avenues in the personalized care of these patients.

Rahme has published over 100 scientific articles and holds more than 15 patents with applications to combatting bacterial infections, and to strategies to limit the emergence of antibiotic-resistant strains. She has also been on, or currently serves on advisory and editorial boards of numerous scientific journals, and has served as an ad-hoc member on review panels at the National Institutes of Health (NIH), National Science Foundation (NSF), Department of Defense (DoD), and several national and international research foundations.

== Awards and honors ==
- 2020-2025: MGH Research Scholar
- 2017: Elected to the American Academy of Microbiology
