= Rehm =

Rehm is a surname, and may refer to:

- Albert Rehm, a German philologist known for his work on the Antikythera mechanism
- Bill Rehm, an American politician
- Diane Rehm, an American public radio talk show host
- Erich Rehm, a German decorated Hauptmann der Reserve in the Wehrmacht during World War II
- Ernst Rehm, German decorated Major in WW II
- Fred Rehm, an American basketball player
- Hans Rehm (officer), a German decorated Korvettenkapitän in WW II
- Heinrich Rehm, a German mycologist and lichenologist
- Karin Baumeister-Rehm (born 1971), a German artist
- Lukas Rehm (born 1990), German politician
- Markus Rehm, a German amputee and Paralympian
- Pam Rehm, an American poet
- Rüdiger Rehm, a German former footballer who is now manager of SG Sonnenhof Großaspach
- Rush Rehm, an associate professor of drama and classics at Stanford University
- Shane Rehm, a New Zealand rugby league referee
- Verena Rehm, a backing vocalist and pianist of the euro-trance dance group Groove Coverage
- Walther Rehm (1901–1963), a German literary scholar, father of Wolfgang
- Wolfgang Rehm (1929–2017), a German musicologist

Other

- Louis Rehm Barn, a barn in Hebron, North Dakota, listed on the United States National Register of Historic Places
