= Hans Rudolf Rahn (died 1655) =

Swiss politician (1594–1655)

- Engraving by Conrad Meyer, 1672
- Baptised: 28 December 1594; Zurich, Old Swiss Confederacy
- Died: 8 November 1655; Zurich, Old Swiss Confederacy
- Occupation: Politician
- Spouses: Barbara Wolf (m. 1616) Elisabetha Künzli (m. 1630)
- Father: Hans Rudolf Rahn
- Relatives: Hans Heinrich Rahn (brother)

Hans Rudolf Rahn (baptized 28 December 1594 – 8 November 1655) was a Swiss politician from Zurich, a member of the Rahn family. He was town clerk of Zurich from 1624, bailiff of Kyburg from 1628 to 1634, mayor (Bürgermeister) of Zurich from 1644 to 1655 and an envoy to the Federal Diet from 1637 to 1653. During his term of office he had to deal with the threat to the Swiss northern border in the Thirty Years' War and with the Peasants' War of 1653.

== Biography ==
Hans Rudolf Rahn was baptized on 28 December 1594 in Zurich, the son of Hans Rudolf Rahn. His brother was Hans Heinrich Rahn. In 1616 he married Barbara Wolf, daughter of Jakob Wolf, a hospital physician (Spitalarzt), and in 1630 Elisabetha Künzli, daughter of Andreas Künzli, an iron merchant (Eisenkrämer).

In 1614–1615 Rahn trained in the Valtellina. In 1617 he became deputy council clerk (Ratssubstitut), in 1621 under-clerk (Unterschreiber) and in 1624 town clerk (Stadtschreiber) of Zurich. From 1628 to 1634 he was bailiff (Landvogt) of Kyburg. From 1634 to 1644 he was guild master (Zunftmeister) of the Widder guild (Widderzunft). He was a member of the Small Council, and from 1634 to 1644 bailiff (Obervogt) of Dübendorf, Schwamendingen, Dietlikon and Rieden. In 1637 he became deputy mayor (Statthalter), and from 1644 to 1655 he was mayor of Zurich. From 1637 to 1653 he was an envoy to the Federal Diet (Tagsatzung). From 1653 to 1655 he was head (Obmann) of the Schildner zum Schneggen.

During the Thirty Years' War, Rahn had to deal with the threat that the warring parties posed to the Swiss northern border. Further challenges of his term of office were the expansion of the city fortifications, the tax revolt in the County of Kyburg in 1644–1645, confessional disputes in the Thurgau, France's efforts to renew, despite high debts and arrears of pay, the mercenary alliance (Soldallianz) that had expired in 1651, and the Peasants' War of 1653 in Lucerne and Bern. He died in Zurich on 8 November 1655.

== Bibliography ==
- W. Schnyder-Spross, Die Familie Rahn von Zürich, 1951, 91–124
