= Partnership limited by shares =

Type of company

A partnership limited by shares is a hybrid between a partnership and a limited liability company. The capital and ownership of the company is divided between shareholders who have a limited liability and one or more partners who have full liability for the remainder of the company's debts. The partner(s) will usually direct the operations of the company while the shareholders are passive investors.

- In Belgium and the Netherlands, this structure is known as Commanditaire vennootschap op aandelen (CommVA/CVA).
- In Denmark, this structure is known as Partnerselskab (or Kommanditaktieselskab).
- In France and Luxembourg, this structure is known as Société en commandite par actions (SCA).
- In Germany, this structure is known as Kommanditgesellschaft auf Aktien (KGaA) and is not common.
- In Italy, this structure is known as Società in accomandita per azioni (s.a.p.a).
- In Iceland, this structure is known as Samlagshlutafélag (slhf.).
- In Poland, this structure is known as spółka komandytowo-akcyjna (S.K.A.).
- In Spain, this structure is known as sociedad comanditaria por acciones (SCA).
- In Portugal, this structure is known as sociedade em comandita por acções.
