= Hans Heinrich Rahn (mayor) =

Swiss politician (1593–1669)

- Engraving by Sebastian Walch after Johann Caspar Füssli, 1756
- Born: 7 July 1593; Zurich, Old Swiss Confederacy
- Died: 21 September 1669 (aged 76); Zurich, Old Swiss Confederacy
- Occupation: Politician
- Spouse: Ursula Escher vom Glas
- Children: Johann Heinrich Rahn
- Father: Hans Rudolf Rahn
- Relatives: Hans Rudolf Rahn (brother)

Hans Heinrich Rahn (7 July 1593 – 21 September 1669) was a Swiss politician from Zurich, a member of the Rahn family. He was guild master of the Widder guild from 1627 to 1655 and mayor (Bürgermeister) of Zurich from 1655. Thanks to him, the debts from the First War of Villmergen of 1656 were quickly paid off.

== Biography ==
Hans Heinrich Rahn was born on 7 July 1593 in Zurich, the son of Hans Rudolf Rahn. His brother was Hans Rudolf Rahn. He married Ursula Escher vom Glas, daughter of Hans Conrad Escher, deputy mayor (Statthalter). His son was the mathematician Johann Heinrich Rahn.

In 1616 Rahn became Amtmann of Töss. From 1627 to 1655 he was guild master (Zunftmeister) of the Widder guild (Widderzunft), and from 1629 to 1651 director of monasteries (Obmann gemeiner Klöster). In 1652 he became deputy mayor (Statthalter), and from 1655 he was mayor of Zurich. He belonged to the Schildner zum Schneggen.

Thanks to Rahn, the debts from the First War of Villmergen of 1656 were quickly paid off. He died in Zurich on 21 September 1669.

== Bibliography ==
- E. Usteri, Die Schildner zum Schneggen, 1960, 157–158
