= Hans Rudolf Rahn (died 1627) =

Swiss politician (1560–1627)

- Engraving by Sebastian Walch after Johann Caspar Füssli, 1756
- Born: 29 September 1560; Zurich, Old Swiss Confederacy
- Died: 14 November 1627 (aged 67); Zurich, Old Swiss Confederacy
- Occupation: Politician
- Spouse: Regula Hegner (m. 1586)
- Children: Hans Heinrich Rahn; Hans Rudolf Rahn
- Parents: Heinrich Rahn (father); Dorothea Ammann (mother)

Hans Rudolf Rahn (29 September 1560 – 14 November 1627) was a Swiss politician from Zurich, a member of the Rahn family. Elected mayor (Bürgermeister) of Zurich in 1607, he determined the city's policy from the start, conducted a successful alliance policy and became a leading figure in the politics of the Confederacy, without whose consent hardly anything was possible in negotiations with the thirteen cantons.

== Biography ==
Hans Rudolf Rahn was born on 29 September 1560 in Zurich, the son of Heinrich Rahn, a guild master (Zunftmeister), and Dorothea Ammann. In 1586 he married Regula Hegner, daughter of Diethelm Hegner, town clerk (Stadtschreiber) of Winterthur. His sons Hans Heinrich and Hans Rudolf were also mayors of Zurich.

After primary school in Zurich, Rahn completed his further education, which was aimed at state service or a political career, in France (five years) and Italy (four years). There, besides learning the languages, he mainly studied law.

In 1586 Rahn entered the state service of Zurich as a sworn clerk (geschworener Schreiber), and at the same time he took a seat in the Grand Council as a representative of the Widder guild (Widderzunft). Only two years later he reached the Small Council. He served as censor from 1587 to 1608, as bailiff (Obervogt) of Wiedikon from 1588 to 1606, in 1590 as a bailiff (Landvogt) of the Confederacy in the Freie Ämter, and from 1594 to 1606 as director of monasteries (Obmann gemeiner Klöster). A supporter of reform, in 1601 he headed the government commission for a new school ordinance, which was to give pupils a sufficient basic education for higher studies.

Elected mayor in 1607, Rahn determined policy from the start. From 1609, together with Leonhard Holzhalb, he conducted a successful policy of alliances. With tenacity and negotiating skill, after the Gachnang affair (Gachnangerhandel) of 1610 he helped to prevent a war with the Catholic cantons and to conclude new alliances with the Margrave of Baden-Durlach (1612), with France (1614) and with Venice (1615). He became a leading figure in the politics of the Confederacy, without whose consent hardly anything was possible in negotiations with the thirteen cantons. In domestic politics, in 1622 he pushed through a compromise in the state reform concerning Zurich's election practices that the antistes Johann Jakob Breitinger had demanded. He died in Zurich on 14 November 1627.

== Bibliography ==
- W. Schnyder-Spross, Die Familie Rahn von Zürich, 1951, 43–91
- Geschichte des Kantons Zürich, 2, 1996, 311, 334–336
