= Landolt & Cie =

Swiss private bank

Coordinates: 46.5093°N 6.6290°E

- Industry: Financial services
- Founded: 1780; 246 years ago
- Defunct: July 8, 2021
- Headquarters: Lausanne, Switzerland
- Products: private banking, asset management
- Revenue: CHF
- Total assets: AUM $3 billion (2020)
- Website: www.landoltetcie.ch

Landolt & Cie, Banquiers was a Swiss private bank specializing in asset management for wealthy private customers, headquartered in Lausanne and founded in 1780 in Lausanne. On October 15, 2020 the shareholders made public that the private bank will merge with ODDO BHF.

== History ==
The banking practice was founded in 1780 by Samuel Hollard. He was the first mayor of Lausanne when the city reigned its independence from the Canton of Bern who was also active as wine merchant and banker. The bank has ever since been the last independent bank in the Canton of Vaud.

It was since acquired by Hermann Hofstetter and in 1973 it was renamed Hofstetter, Landolt & Cie, as Marc-Edouard Landolt joined Bernard Hofstetter as a partner. In 1990, it was renamed Landolt, Lonfat & Cie., banquiers and in 1994 Landolt & Cie, banquiers. The Landolt family are descendants of the Sandoz family, which founded Novartis.

It is organised in the form of a Kommanditgesellschaft with three partners. The bank specialises in asset management for private customers and institutional investors, and is the oldest such institution in the French-speaking part of Switzerland. The bank has secondary offices in Geneva and Crans-Montana.

== Merger with ODDO BHF ==
On October 15, 2020 the banks shareholders Pierre Landolt and Thierry Lombard announced the merger of Landolt & Cie with the Franco-German banking group ODDO BHF. Both shareholders will become partners and shareholder of the new structure, a press statement announced. Through the acquisition, ODDO BHF, wants to strengthen their activity in the field of private wealth management. Landolt & Cie had 75% of Swiss clients which will benefit the new structure substantially. At the time of the merger the bank had assets under management (AUM) of $3 billion.
