= Johann Heinrich Rahn (mathematician) =

Swiss mathematician (1622–1676)

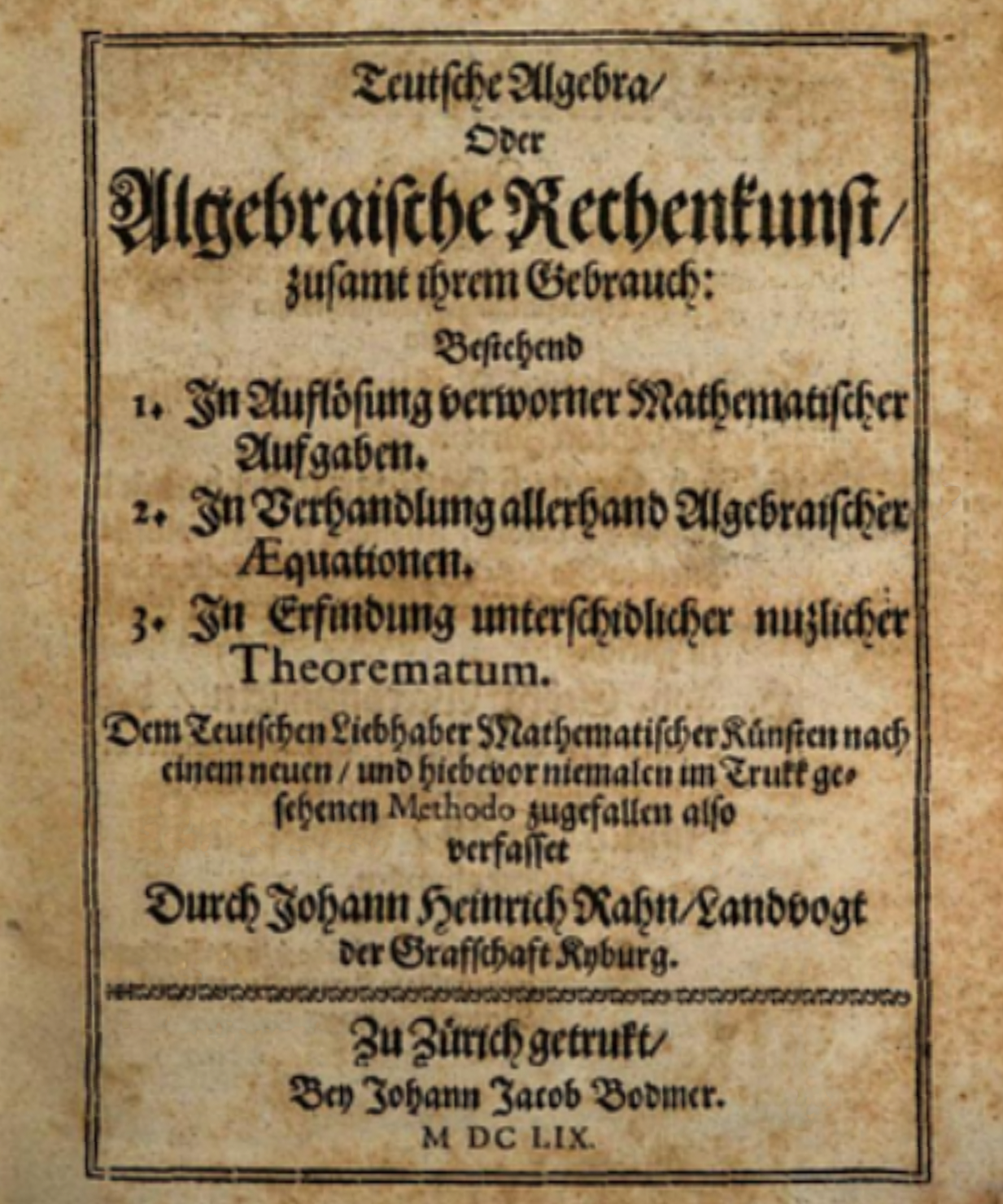
Title page of Johann Heinrich Rahn's Teutsche Algebra (1659)

Johann Heinrich Rahn (also known as Hans Heinrich Rahn and Johann Rahn; 10 March 1622 – 27 May 1676) was a Swiss mathematician who is credited with the first use of the division sign, ÷ (a repurposed obelus variant) and the therefore sign, ∴. The symbols were used in Teutsche Algebra, published in 1659. John Pell collaborated with Rahn in this book, which contains an example of the Pell equation. It is uncertain whether Rahn or Pell was responsible for introducing the symbols.

== Biography ==
Rahn was born in Töss, in the canton of Zurich, on 10 March 1622, the son of Ursula Escher vom Glas and Hans Heinrich Rahn, Amtmann of Töss and future mayor of Zurich. As the member of a prominent burgher family of Zurich, he entered the city's Grand Council in 1642 and its Small Council in 1669. Rahn served in a number of public offices in the canton of Zurich: he was Landvogt of Kyburg from 1658 to 1664, Obervogt of Küsnacht in 1670, head of the arsenal in 1672 and treasurer in 1674.

Rahn's interest in mathematics was likely instilled by Hans Georg Werdmüller. Oliver Cromwell's diplomatic representative in Zurich, John Pell, introduced him to the study of algebra between 1654 and 1658. In 1659, Rahn published his Teutsche Algebra, the first German-language presentation of the new algebraic theories of François Viète and René Descartes. The work first discusses the six basic arithmetic operations (addition, subtraction, multiplication, division, exponentiation, and root extraction) and the theory of equations. Drawing on treatises of earlier mathematicians, it then presents a mixture of equation exercises, in addition to trigonometric and relatively simple analytic geometry problems.

Thomas Brancker, with Pell's assistance, published an English translation of Teutsche Algebra in 1668, which brought the work to widespread circulation. Rahn was also interested in astronomy and optics. He created a draft of a perpetual calendar and studied the prediction of eclipses and the passage of comets, while opposing astrology. Rahn died in Zurich on 27 May 1676, aged 54.

== See also ==
- History of mathematical notation

== Bibliography ==
- R. Acampora: Johann Heinrich Rahn und seine Teutsche Algebra, in R. Gebhardt (Herausgeber) Visier- und Rechenbücher der frühen Neuzeit, Schriften des Adam-Ries-Bundes Annaberg-Buchholz 19, 2008, S. 163–178
- Florian Cajori: A History of Mathematical Notations. 2 volumes. Lasalle, Illinois: The Open Court Publishing Co., 1928–1929 vol. 2, page 211.
- Moritz Cantor: Rahn, Johann Heinrich . In: General German Biography (ADB). Volume 27, Duncker & Humblot, Leipzig, 1888, pp. 174 f
- Noel Malcolm, Jacqueline Stedall: John Pell (1611–1685) and His Correspondence with Sir Charles Cavendish: The Mental World of an Early Modern Mathematician, Oxford University Press, Oxford, 2005
- Christoph Scriba: John Pell's English Edition of J. H. Rahn 's Teutsche Algebra, in: R. S. Cohen (Herausgeber) For Dirk Struik, Reidel: Dordrecht 1974, S. 261–274
- Jacqueline Stedall: A Discourse Concerning Algebra: English Algebra to 1685, Oxford University Press, Oxford, 2002
