= Pythagorean =

Pythagorean, meaning of or pertaining to the ancient Ionian mathematician, philosopher, and music theorist Pythagoras, may refer to:

== Philosophy ==
- Pythagoreanism, the esoteric and metaphysical beliefs purported to have been held by Pythagoras
- Neopythagoreanism, a school of philosophy reviving Pythagorean doctrines that became prominent in the 1st and 2nd centuries AD
- Pythagorean diet, the name for vegetarianism before the nineteenth century

== Mathematics ==
- Pythagorean theorem
- Pythagorean triple
- Pythagorean prime
- Pythagorean trigonometric identity
- Table of Pythagoras, another name for the multiplication table

== Music ==
- Pythagorean comma
- Pythagorean hammers
- Pythagorean tuning

== Other uses ==
- Pythagorean cup
- Pythagorean expectation, a baseball statistical term
- Pythagorean letter

== See also ==
- List of things named after Pythagoras
