= List of things named after Pythagoras =

This is a list of things named after Pythagoras, the ancient Greek philosopher, mystic, mathematician, and music theorist.

== Philosophy and mysticism ==
- Pythagoreanism – the system of philosophy of Pythagoras and his followers
- Neopythagoreanism – a later philosophical system
- Pythagorean cup – a drinking cup that forces its user to imbibe only in moderation
- Pythagorean letter – the Greek letter upsilon, used as a symbol by the Pythagoreans
- Pythagorean diet – vegetarianism
- Pythagorean symbol – the tetractys
- Pythagorean system – the distinctive system of numerology used by the Pythagoreans

== Mathematics ==
- Pythagorean theorem – the statement that the sum of the areas of the squares on the sides of a right triangle is the area of the square on the hypotenuse
- Pythagorean triple – a set of three positive integers that can occur in the Pythagorean theorem
- Pythagorean quadruple - a set of four positive integers that describes the space diagonal of a cuboid. Also known as a Pythagorean box.
- Pythagorean expectation – a method of statistical analysis inspired by the Pythagorean theorem
- Pythagorean field – in algebra, a field in which the sum of two squares is in every case itself a square
- Pythagorean prime – a prime number of the form 4n + 1
- Pythagorean trigonometric identity – any of several trigonometric identities
- Pythagorean means – the arithmetic mean, the geometric mean, and the harmonic mean
- Pythagorean addition – an arithmetic operation arising from the Pythagorean theorem
- Pythagoras's constant – the square root of 2
- Lute of Pythagoras – a geometric figure
- Pythagoras tree – a fractal geometric figure
- Table of Pythagoras, another name for the Multiplication table

== Music ==
- Pythagorean comma
- Pythagorean tuning
- Pythagorean hammers
- Pythagorean interval

== Other ==
- Pythagoras' Cave, where Pythagoras is said to have hidden from the tyrant Polycrates on Mount Kerkis on Samos
- Pythagoreion, a town on Samos
- Pythagoras (crater) – a lunar crater
- PythagoraSwitch – a Japanese educational TV program, which also features sequences showing Pythagorean Devices (ピタゴラ装置, Pitagora Sōchi). Pythagorean Devices are known in the US as "Rube Goldberg machines", or in Great Britain as "Heath Robinson" contraptions.
- Pythagoras Mechanical Workshop Museum – a building—a former factory—in Sweden
- School of Pythagoras – the oldest building in St John's College, Cambridge
- Pythagoras ABM – an agent-based software model
- Knights of Pythagoras – a Masonic body for boys
