= Ágios Ioánnis Theológos =

Ágios Ioánnis Theológos may refer to:

- The Chapel of Saint John Theologos, on the isle of Samos, Greece
- The Monastery of Saint John Theologos, at Gouves, Greece
