= Porta Maggiore Basilica =

Ancient Roman civic basilica in Rome

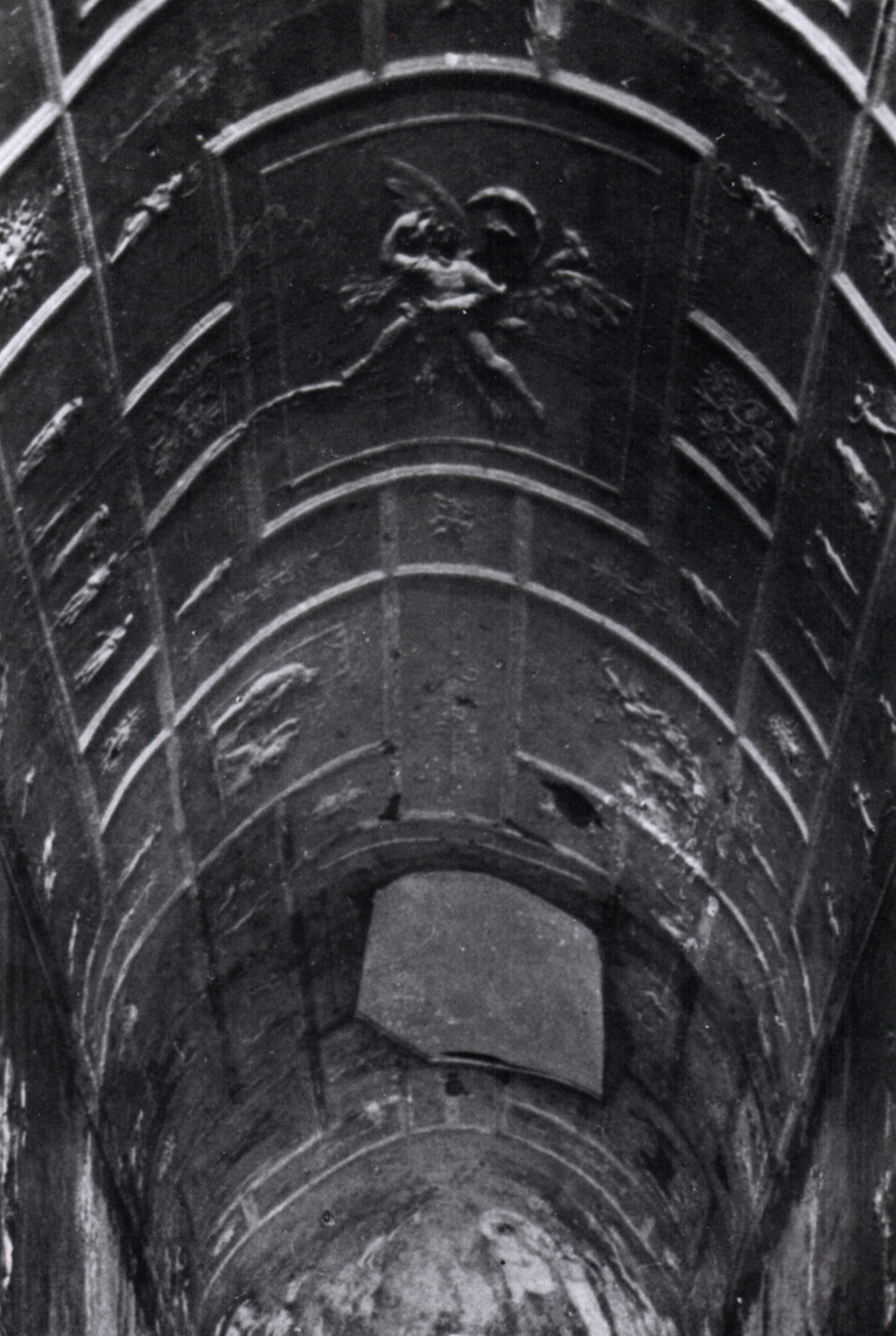
- Vault of the Porta Maggiore Basilica

- Shown within Augustan Rome
- Interactive map of Porta Maggiore Basilica
- 41°53′29″N 12°30′55″E
- Type: Basilica

The Porta Maggiore Basilica is an underground basilica discovered in 1917 near Porta Maggiore in Rome. It is dated to the 1st century BC. It is believed to have been the meeting place of the neo-Pythagoreans and is the only historical site that has been associated with the neo-Pythagorean movement. This school of mystical Hellenistic philosophy preached asceticism and was based on the works of Pythagoras and Plato. It was a precursor to the basilicas built during the Christian period, centuries later. It was opened to small groups of visitors in April 2015.

== Discovery ==
The basilica is 12 m (40 ft) below the street level. The underground chamber was discovered accidentally in 1917 during the construction of a railway line from Rome to Cassino. An underground passage caved in, revealing the hidden chamber.

The structure is thought to have been constructed by the Statilius family. The head of the family Titus Statilius Taurus was accused by the Senate for what Tacitus in his Annals calls "addiction to magical superstitions". Taurus protested his innocence but eventually committed suicide in 53 CE.

== Architecture ==
The basilica has three naves lined by six rock pillars and an apse. They are decorated with stucco images of centaurs, griffins and satyrs. Classical heroes such as Achilles, Orpheus, Paris and Hercules are also represented.

Originally the basilica was entered through a long downhill entrance from the Prenestina Street, and through a vestibule.

== Opening ==
The basilica underwent several years of restoration work. In 1951, a concrete shell was constructed that enclosed the entire basilica. Air purifiers from IQAir in Switzerland have been installed to combat radon gas.

The 40 ft-long basilica is now opened to visitors. The visiting groups are kept small because of the fragility of the monument. The temperature and humidity is kept within a narrow range. It is open during 2nd and 4th Sunday of every month, and the tour is prearranged.

Preceded by Pantheon	Landmarks of Rome; Porta Maggiore Basilica	Succeeded by Roman Forum
