= Kerkis =

Mountain in Greece

Highest point
- Elevation: 1,433 m (4,701 ft)
- Prominence: 1,433 m (4,701 ft)
- Listing: Ribu
- Coordinates: 37°43.582′N 26°37.323′E

Geography
- Location: Samos, Greece

Kerkis or Kerketeus (Greek, Modern: Κέρκης, Kérkis; Modern Greek pronunciation: [ˈcercis]; Ancient: Κερκετεύς, Kerketeús) is a mountain, forming the bulk of the western part of the Greek island of Samos. Its highest peak, named Vigla (Βίγλα), is at 1,433 m (4,701 ft), making it the second-highest peak in the East Aegean (after Fengari on Samothrace). The mountain's name, in both ancient and modern forms, means roughly, "belonging to Circe".

The mountain has a whitish color due to being composed of marble, especially visible on several exposed cliffs. It is considered a sanctuary for numerous plants and animals, some of them endangered, and so is part of the European Union's Natura 2000 network of protected sites. There are also several small monasteries on its slopes, as well as a number of caves. Of these, the most notable is the Cave of Pythagoras on the eastern slope, in which Pythagoras is reputed to have hidden from the tyrant Polycrates prior to going into exile in Italy.
