= Moderatus of Gades =

1st century AD Greek philosopher

Moderatus of Gades (Greek: Μοδερᾶτος) was a Greek philosopher of the Neopythagorean school, who lived in the 1st century AD. He was a contemporary of Apollonius of Tyana. He wrote a great work on the doctrines of the Pythagoreans, and tried to show that the successors of Pythagoras had made no additions to the views of their founder, but had merely borrowed and altered the phraseology.

== Life ==
Moderatus was from Gades, in Andalusia. He was probably a relative of the writer Columella (Lucius Junius Moderatus Columella), who shared the same cognomen and was also from Gades. Almost nothing is known about the life of Moderatus. The only concrete clue is provided by Plutarch, who reports that when he, Plutarch, returned to Rome after a long absence, Lucius, a disciple of Moderatus, who came from Etruria, was attending a banquet hosted by Sextius Sulla, a friend of Plutarch's. Since the banquet took place around 90 AD, it can be assumed that the teaching activity of Moderatus fell in the second half of the 1st century.Moderatus lived in Rome, at least part of the time. According to Plutarch's description, Lucius adhered to the rules of the Pythagorean way of life, so he valued the practice of a lifestyle oriented towards philosophical goals. It is unclear whether this is due to the influence of his teacher, Moderatus, and thus no concrete conclusions can be drawn about his adherence to this lifestyle.

=== Works ===
The writings of the Moderatus have been lost except for fragments. In his biography of Pythagoras, the Neoplatonist Porphyry quotes or paraphrases a passage from a work by Moderatus in which the doctrines of the Pythagoreans were compiled, which apparently concerned primarily the Pythagorean theory of numbers. It is uncertain whether this writing consisted of ten or eleven books. Another Moderatus fragment is preserved in Simplicius's commentary on Aristotle's Physics, which is taken from a lost treatise by Porphyry on matter. The late antique scholar Stobaeus also preserves two fragments of Moderatus' work in his Eclogae about the theory of numbers, which John M. Dillon notes bear a strong resemblance to the work of Theon of Smyrna, implying that either Theon used Moderatus work as a principal source, or that Stobaeus misattributed the source of the quote. The Byzantine author Stephanus of Byzantium mentions a writing "Pythagorean Lectures" in five books that Moderatus wrote. The Neoplatonist Iamblichus reports on a doctrine of Moderatus about the soul; It is not known which work he is referring to. The Neoplatonists Syrianus and Proclus also mention Moderatus' views. The church father Jerome calls Moderatus an excellent writer (virum eloquentissimum), whom Iamblichus imitated.

== Philosophy ==
Moderatus wrote a work titled "Lectures on Pythagoreanism" in either ten or eleven books, which Porphyry characterized in his Life of Pythagoras. as containing all of the doctrines of the Pythagoreans:

Among others, Moderatus of Gades, who [learnedly] treated of the qualities of numbers in seven books, states that the Pythagoreans specialized in the study of numbers to explain their teachings symbolically, as do geometricians, inasmuch as the primary forms and principles are hard to understand and express, otherwise, in plain discourse. A similar case is the representation of sounds by letters, which are known by marks, which are called the first elements of learning; later, they inform us these are not the true elements, which they only signify.

As the geometricians cannot express incorporeal forms in words, and have recourse to the descriptions of figures, as that is a triangle, and yet do not mean that the actually seen lines are the triangle, but only what they represent, the knowledge in the mind, so the Pythagoreans used the same objective method in respect to first reasons and forms. As these incorporeal forms and first principles could not be expressed in words, they had recourse to demonstration by numbers. Number one denoted to them the reason of Unity, Identity, Equality, the purpose of friendship, sympathy, and conservation of the Universe, which results from persistence in Sameness. For unity in the details harmonizes all the parts of a whole, as by the participation of the First Cause. .

Number two, or Duad, signifies the two-fold reason of diversity and inequality, of everything that is divisible, or mutable, existing at one time in one way, and at another time in another way. After all these methods were not confined to the Pythagoreans, being used by other philosophers to denote unitive powers, which contain all things in the universe, among which are certain reasons of equality, dissimilitude and diversity. These reasons are what they meant by the terms Monad and Duad, or by the words uniform, biform, or diversiform.

The same reasons apply to their use of other numbers, which were ranked according to certain powers. Things that had a beginning, middle and end, they denoted by the number Three, saying that anything that has a middle is triform, which was applied to every perfect thing. They said that if anything was perfect it would make use of this principle and be adorned, according to it; and as they had no other name for it, they invented the form Triad; and whenever they tried to bring us to the knowledge of what is perfect they led us to that by the form of this Triad. So also with the other numbers, which were ranked according to the same reasons.

All other things were comprehended under a single form and power which they called Decad, explaining it by a pun as decad, meaning comprehension. That is why they called Ten a perfect number, the most perfect of all as comprehending all difference of numbers, reasons, species and proportions. For if the nature of the universe be defined according to the reasons and proportions of members, and if that which is produced, increased and perfected, proceed according to the reason of numbers; and since the Decad comprehends every reason of numbers, every proportion, and every species, why should Nature herself not be denoted by the most perfect number, Ten? Such was the use of numbers among the Pythagoreans.

This primary philosophy of the Pythagoreans finally died out first, because it was enigmatical, and then because their commentaries were written in Doric, which dialect itself is somewhat obscure, so that Doric teachings were not fully understood, and they became misapprehended, and finally spurious, and later, they who published them no longer were Pythagoreans. The Pythagoreans affirm that Plato, Aristotle, Speusippus, Aristoxenus and Xenocrates; appropriated the best of them, making but minor changes (to distract attention from this their theft), they later collected and delivered as characteristic Pythagorean doctrines whatever therein was most trivial, and vulgar, and whatever had been invented by envious and calumnious persons, to cast contempt on Pythagoreanism.

— Porphyry, Life of Pythagoras, §48-53

A difficulty in determining the doctrines of Moderatus arises from the fact that Porphyry does not indicate exactly where in this account the rendering of Moderatus' statements begins and ends. Depending on how much of the text handed down by Porphyry is attributed to Moderatus, the picture that emerges from his philosophy changes. Another problem is that Porphyry may have inserted or altered individual passages of text, so that it is to be expected that in his account Moderatus' way of thinking and terminology appears more neoplatonic than it actually was. It is unclear and controversial in research whether Porphyry took his presentation from an opinion of Pythagoreans about the relationship of later philosophers to the Pythagorean teachings of a writing by Moderatus.

According to this view communicated by Porphyry, which according to some researchers corresponds to the point of view of Moderatus, the main achievements of Greek philosophy are due to Pythagoras. Subsequent philosophers such as Plato, the Platonists Speusippus and Xenocrates, and Aristotle and Aristoxenus would have done no more than assimilate the fruitful contents of the Pythagorean doctrine, making only minor changes. On the other hand, they would have distanced themselves from everything that could appear questionable and vulnerable in the Pythagorean tradition by presenting it as the specifically Pythagorean body of thought. Moderatus probably arrived at this idea of the history of philosophy by reading pseudepigraphic Pythagorean treatises in which he found Platonic and Aristotelian ideas. He mistook these writings for the authentic works of Pythagoreans who lived before Plato, and concluded that the early Pythagoreans already possessed the philosophical insights set forth in Plato's dialogues.

Moderatus understood the Pythagorean theory of numbers as an attempt to communicate statements about metaphysical circumstances in a catchy language for didactic reasons. The function of the numbers in the explanations of the Pythagoreans corresponds to that of drawn figures in geometry; Just as the drawings are not themselves the geometric figures, but only illustrate them, so for the Pythagoreans the numbers are tools and symbols that are intended to make what is meant, difficult to express verbally, understandable. So the one stands for the principle of eternal unity and equality, the continuance of what is always self-identical. This points to the essential togetherness of all things, which results from their common origin. The dyad is the principle of diversity and inequality, of divisible things and of that which is constantly changing. The triad expresses the essence of something that has a beginning, a middle and an end and thus proves to be complete. The other numbers up to ten, the most perfect number, can also be interpreted in this way.

It is uncertain whether another passage in Porphyry is also based on the explanations of the Moderatus. There it is said that Pythagoras showed his students a path to happiness by leading them in small steps from dealing with the material and perishable to contemplating the incorporeal, imperishable and real.

The Neoplatonist Simplicius also reports on a metaphysical doctrine of Moderatus, which he knows from an otherwise lost treatise by Porphyry. In this system, the term "the One" designates three different entities on three different ontological levels. At the highest level, the One is transcendent, that is, beyond the realm of beings and substance. Below that is a level where "the One" stands for true being or the world of (Platonic) ideas; that is the intelligible one. Below that follows a third level, that of a sensible “One” that on the one hand has a share in the first and second One and on the other hand forms the starting point for the existence of things that can be perceived by the senses. The One—it is uncertain which One is meant—contains the principle of intrinsically empty, formless quantity, whose existence is made possible by the One's divesting itself of its own principles and forms. The quantity is thus conceived negatively, it owes its existence to the fact that a logos is robbed of all its content. Moderatus expressly does not allow sense objects to participate in the transcendent One and in the intelligible world, but regards them only as a reflection of ideas. The material world is far from good and therefore appears to Moderatus as bad. However, its badness is not absolute, because it is subject to limits due to the ordering laws to which it is subject, it is mathematically structured and thus not completely withdrawn from the influence of the good.

Apparently this doctrine is influenced by the spurious second epistle attributed to Plato. In a study published in 1928, Eric Robertson Dodds put forward his hypothesis that the ontological model of Moderatus is the result of a metaphysical interpretation of statements in Plato's dialogue Parmenides and that the Neo-Pythagorean metaphysics anticipate elements of Neo-Platonic thought (especially the Neo-Platonic Parmenides interpretation). This view has found favor in research, although the formulations handed down by Simplicius may not have come in part from Moderatus, but from the reporter Porphyry and reflect his neo-Platonic ideas. The extent to which Moderatus is to be regarded as a forerunner of Plotinus' Neoplatonism is debatable.

In his conception of the soul, Moderatus followed a line that defined the soul within the framework of the theory of numbers and described its function as that of a factor creating harmony between different elements. From his point of view, this approach was compatible with the doctrine of the immortality of the soul, which was self-evident for the Neopythagoreans.
