= Cave of Pythagoras =

Cave near Marathokampos, Samos, Greece

- Pythagoras' Cave
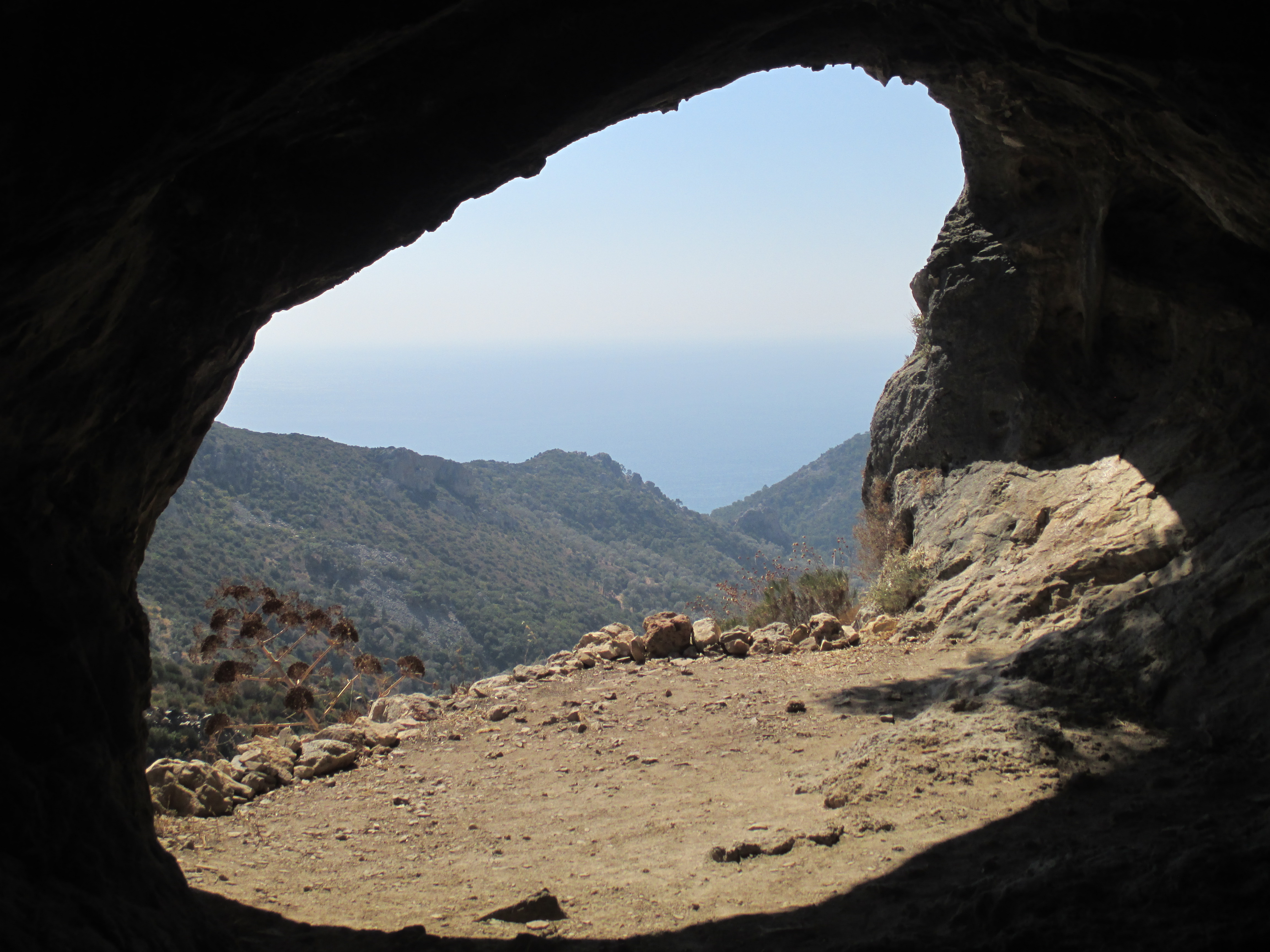
- View from Pythagoras' cave.
- Interactive map of Cave of Pythagoras
- Location: Samos, Greece
- Coordinates: 37.7283509°N 26.6593376°E

The Cave of Pythagoras (Greek: Σπηλιά του Πυθαγόρα, romanized: Spiliá tou Pythagóra) or Pythagoras' Cave (Greek: Σπηλιά Πυθαγόρα, romanized: Spiliá Pythagóra) is a cavern on the slopes of Mount Kerketeas, the highest mountain on the island of Samos. The cave is believed by island folk tradition to be a location where Pythagoras once lived and taught in the 6th century BC.

The cave is at an elevation of about 300 meters above sea level, west of the village of Marathokampos. It is said that Pythagoras retreated to the cave from the city to escape the anger of the island's tyrant Polycrates. He is reputed to have both lived and taught his students there. A spring at the site is also said to have provided him with drinking water. The knowledge that Pythagoras lived on the island in some cave comes from antiquity and is known from Iamblichus's work "De Vita Pythagorica (On the Pythagorean Life)". However, it is impossible to confirm whether this is indeed the same cave.

== Caves and Chapels ==
The location known as "Pythagoras Cave" actually includes three different caves with several branches and "rooms." Additionally, there are two chapels at the site. A road leads close to the caves, with the final 200-300 meters being a steep path.

=== Pythagoras Cave ===
The main Pythagoras Cave is the lowest of the caves. A smaller path branches off the main path to the right, leading to the cave. Because of this, many visitors overlook it entirely. To reach the cave, one must climb about 2.5 meters up a steep, rugged rock, aided by a rope present at the site. The cave entrance is narrow. Inside, there is a larger lower chamber and a smaller upper chamber. The upper chamber has a large "window" that offers a view to the south.

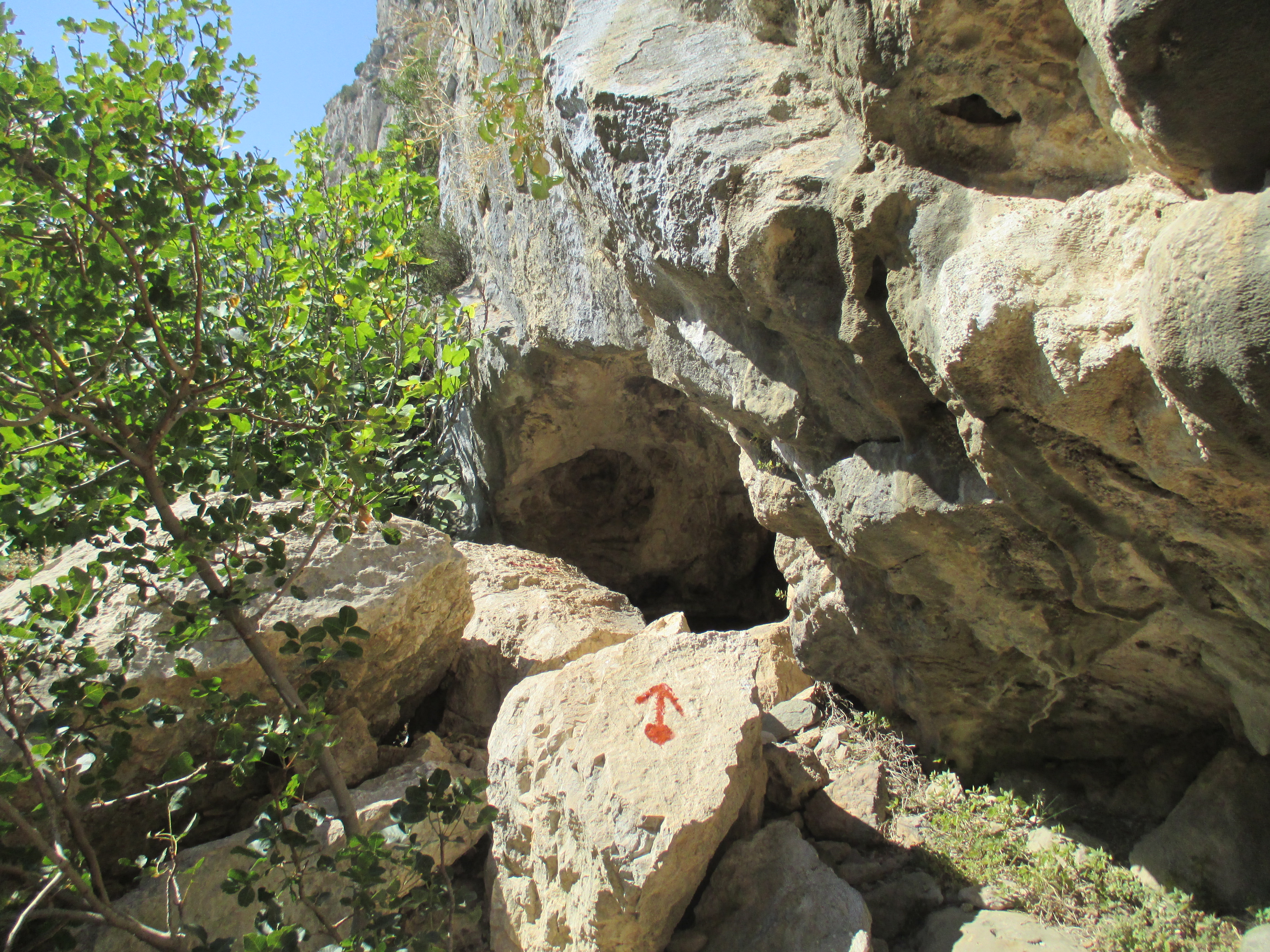
Cave entrance.

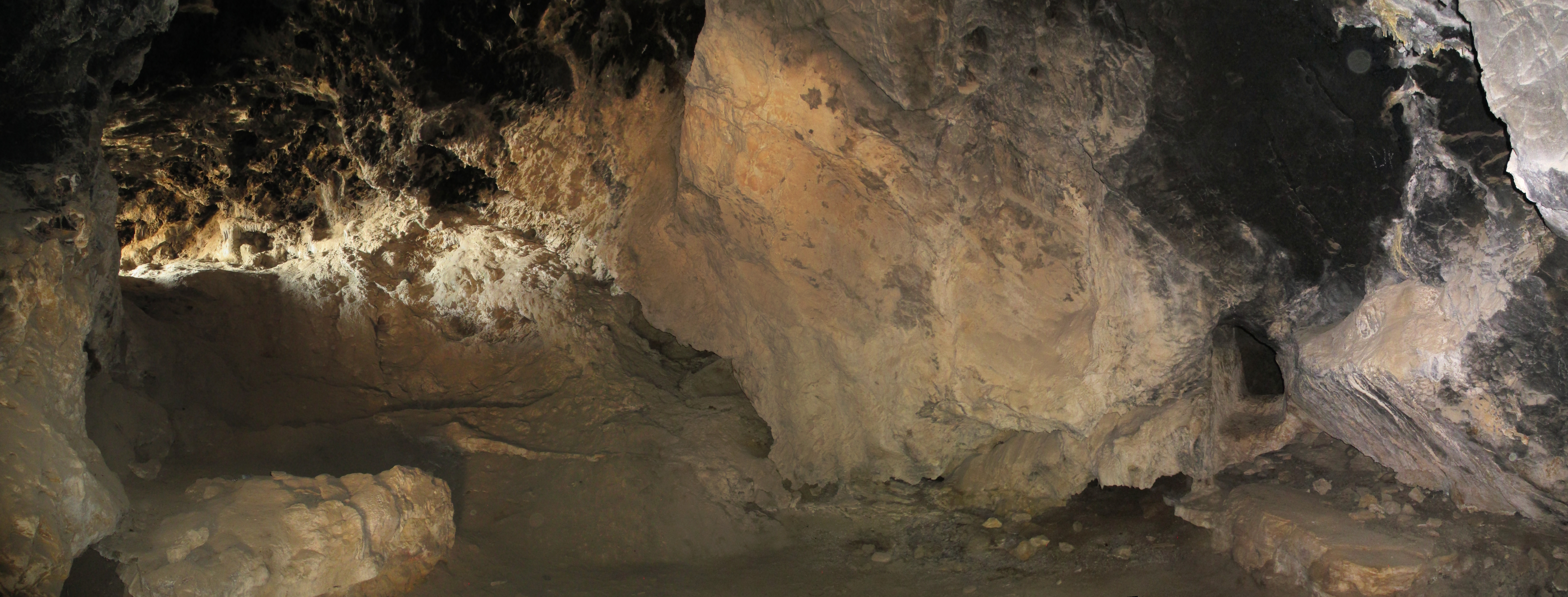
Interior of the cave.

=== Ágios Ioánnis Theológos ===
Further up from the main path intersection leading to Pythagoras Cave is the chapel dedicated to John the Evangelist (Αγίου Ιωάννη του θεολόγου, Ágios Ioánnis Theológos).

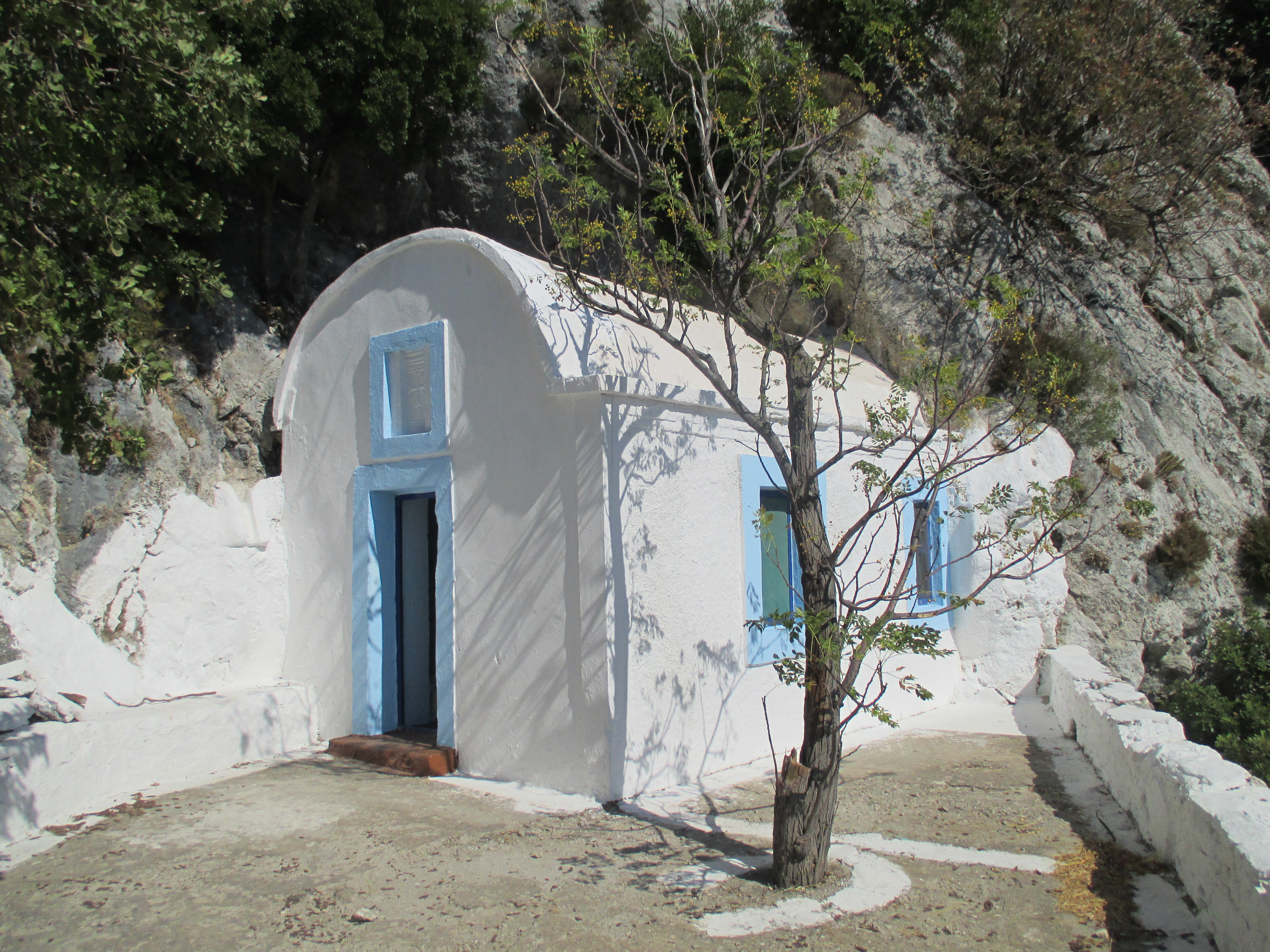
Chapel of John the Evangelist.

=== Panagía Sarantaskaliótissa and its Caves ===
Even higher along the main path, at the top of the stairs, is another chapel dedicated to the "Virgin of the Forty Stairs" (Greek: Παναγία Σαραντασκαλιώτισσα, romanized: Panagía Sarantaskaliótissa) also known as "Virgin Mary the Revealed" (Greek: Παναγία Φανερωμένη, romanized: Panagia Phaneromeni). It was built during the Byzantine period in the 11th century when monks sought refuge in the area. Behind the chapel are two caves, the Panagía Sarantaskaliótissa Caves (Greek: Σπηλαιοβάραθρο Σαραντασκαλιώτισσα, romanized: Spilaiovárathro Sarantaskaliótissa), with the left one being smaller and the right one larger. These caves descend up to 90 meters deep and contain stalactites and stalagmites. Most visitors explore these caves as they are at the end of the path and more easily accessible, thus often being referred to as "Pythagoras Cave."

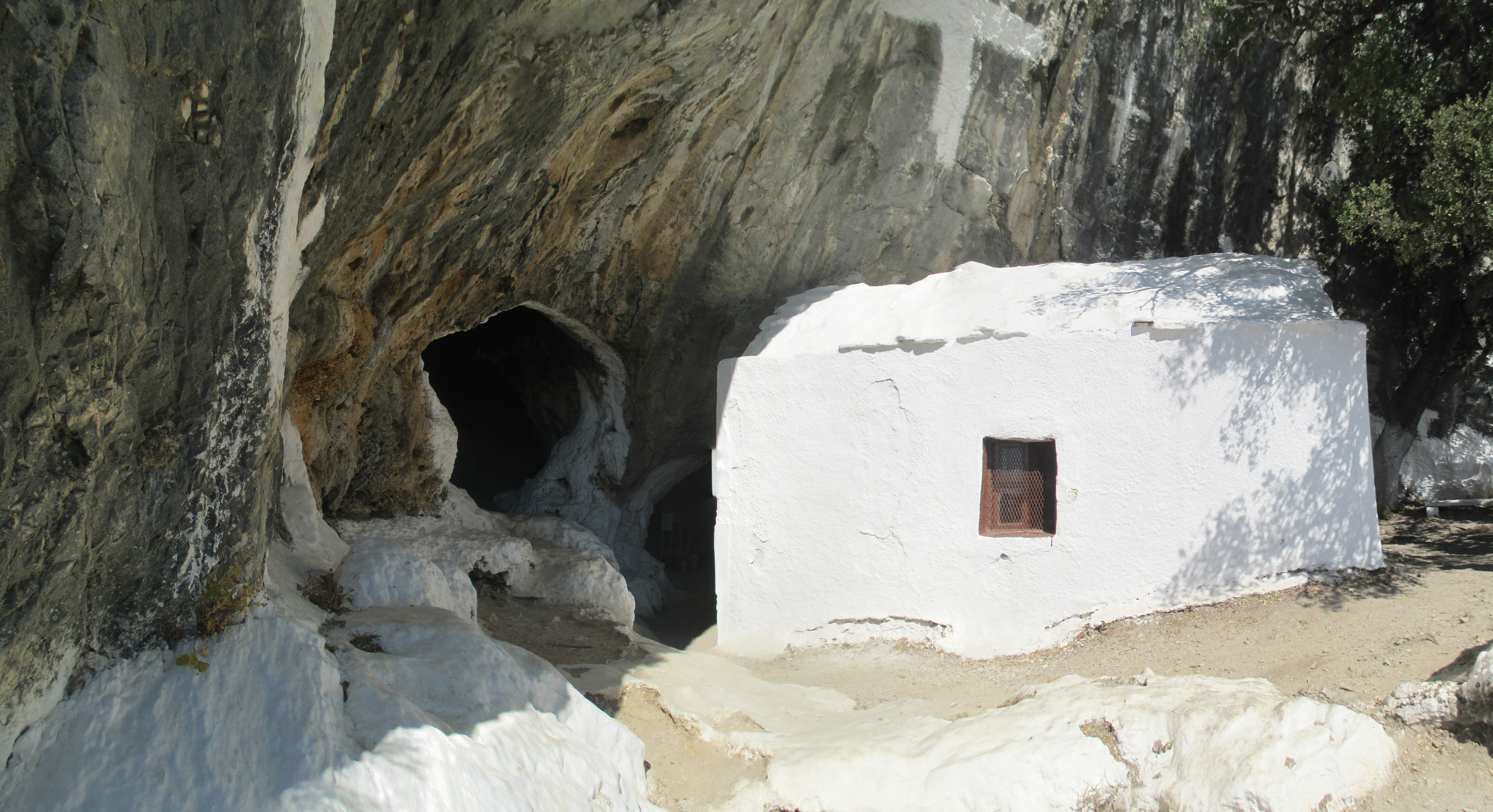
Chapel of the Virgin Mary.

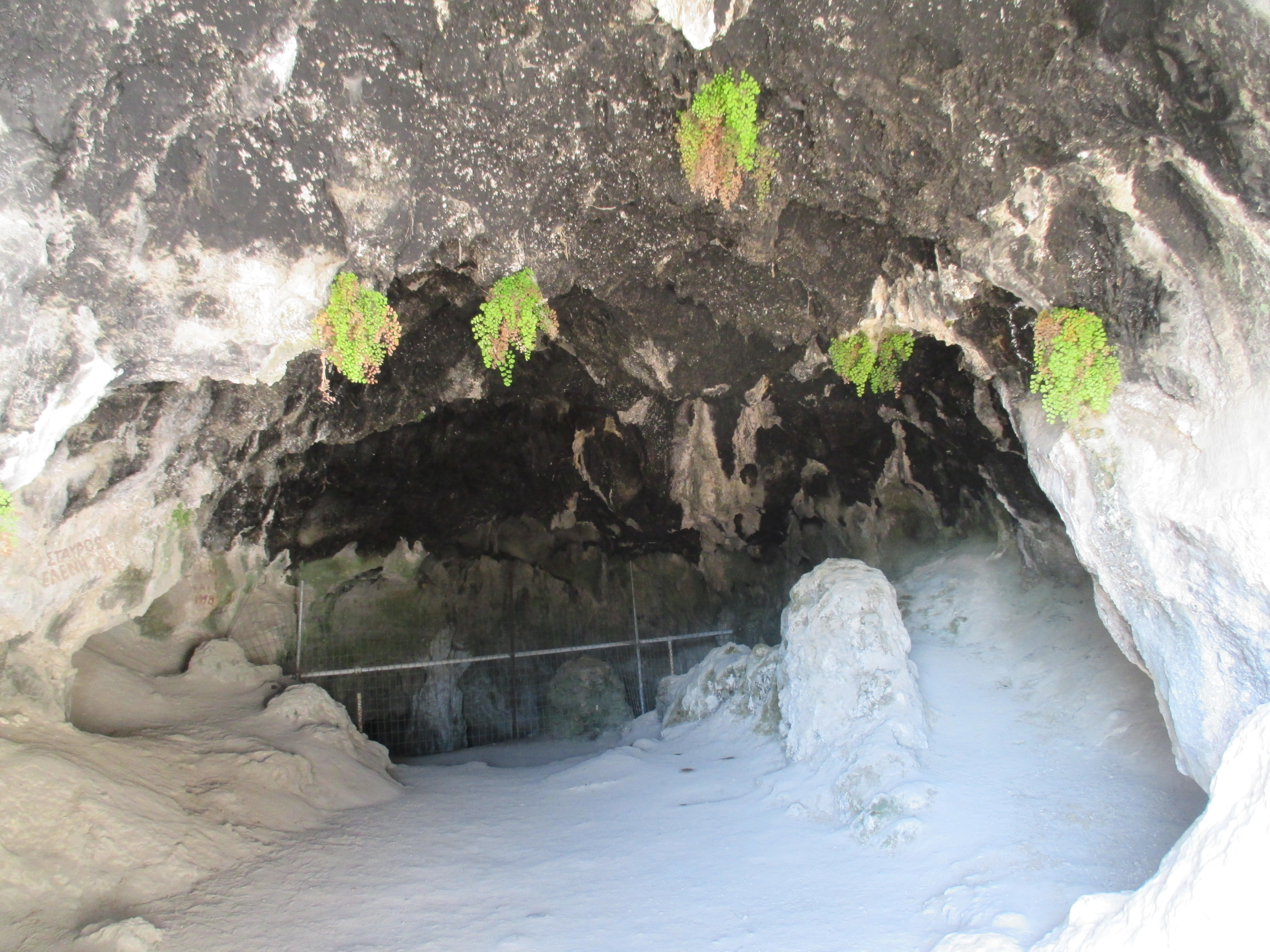
Smaller cave.

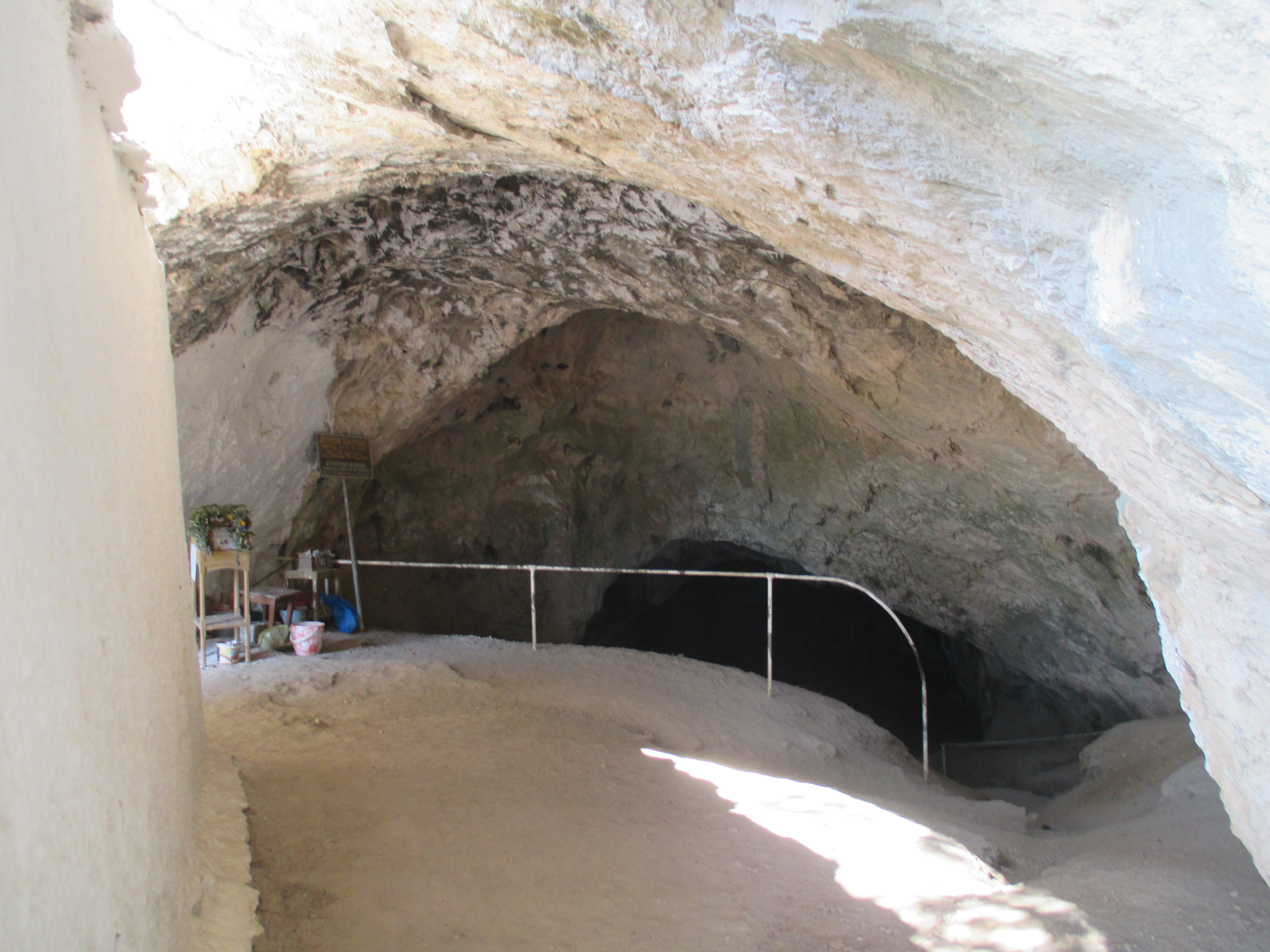
Larger cave.
