= Pythagoras =

Greek philosopher (c. 570 – c. 495 BC)

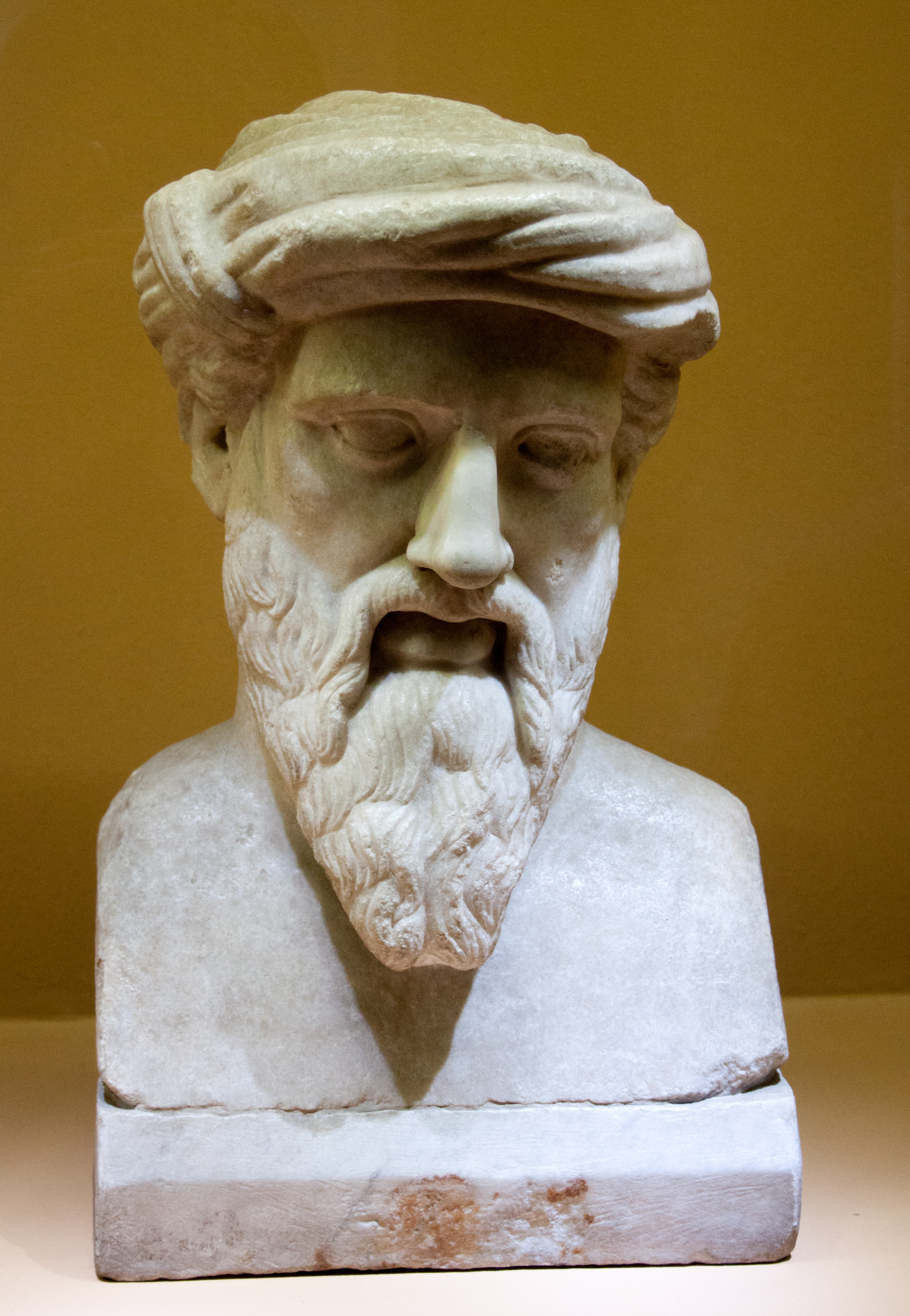
- Bust of Pythagoras of Samos in the Capitoline Museums, Rome
- Born: c. 570 BC; Samos
- Died: c. 495 BC (aged around 75) either Croton or Metapontum

Philosophical work
- Era: Pre-Socratic philosophy
- Region: Western philosophy
- School: Pythagoreanism
- Main interests: Ethics; Mathematics; Metaphysics; Music theory; Mysticism; Politics; Religion
- Notable ideas: Communalism; Metempsychosis; Musica universalis; Attributed ideas: Five climatic zones; Five regular solids; Proportions; Pythagorean theorem; Pythagorean tuning; Sphericity of the Earth; Vegetarianism

Pythagoras of Samos (Note: /paɪˈθæɡərəs/ py-THAG-ər-əs, also US: /pɪˈθæɡərəs/ pih-; Ancient Greek: Πυθαγόρας ὁ Σάμιος, romanized: Pythagóras ho Sámios, lit. 'Pythagoras the Samian', or Πυθαγόρης, Pythagórēs in Ionian Greek.) (Ancient Greek: Πυθαγόρας; c. 570 – c. 495 BC) (Note: "The dates of his life cannot be fixed exactly, but assuming the approximate correctness of the statement of Aristoxenus (Porphyry, Vit. Pyth, §9) that he left Samos to escape the tyranny of Polycrates at the age of forty, we may put his birth round about 570 BC, or a few years earlier. The length of his life was variously estimated in antiquity, but it is agreed that he lived to a fairly ripe old age, and most probably he died at about seventy-five or eighty." Guthrie (1967), p. 173) was an ancient Ionian Greek philosopher, polymath, and the eponymous founder of Pythagoreanism. His political and religious teachings were well known in Magna Graecia and influenced the philosophies of Plato, Aristotle, and, through them, Western philosophy. Modern scholars disagree regarding Pythagoras's education and influences, but most agree that he travelled to Croton in southern Italy around 530 BC, where he founded a school in which initiates were allegedly sworn to secrecy and lived a communal, ascetic lifestyle.

In antiquity, Pythagoras was credited with mathematical and scientific discoveries, such as the Pythagorean theorem, Pythagorean tuning, the five regular solids, the theory of proportions, the sphericity of the Earth, the identity of the morning and evening stars as the planet Venus, and the division of the globe into five climatic zones. He was reputedly the first man to call himself a philosopher ("lover of wisdom"). (Note: Cicero, Tusc. Qu, pp. 431–433, §5.3.8–§5.3.9 (citing Heraclides Ponticus fr. 88 Wehrli), Diog I, 1.12, Diog VIII, §8.8, Iamblichus, Vit. Pyth, §58. Burkert attempted to discredit this ancient tradition Burkert (1960) but it has been defended by De Vogel (1966), pp. 97–102 and Riedweg (2005), p. 92) Historians debate whether Pythagoras made these discoveries and pronouncements, as some of the accomplishments credited to him likely originated earlier or were made by his colleagues or successors, such as Hippasus and Philolaus.

The teaching most securely identified with Pythagoras is the "transmigration of souls" or metempsychosis, which holds that every soul is immortal and, upon death, enters into a new body. He may have also devised the doctrine of musica universalis, which holds that the planets move according to mathematical ratios and thus resonate to produce an inaudible symphony of music. Following Croton's decisive victory over Sybaris in around 510 BC, Pythagoras's followers came into conflict with supporters of democracy, and their meeting houses were burned. Pythagoras may have been killed during this persecution, or he may have escaped to Metapontum and died there.

Pythagoras influenced Plato whose dialogues (especially Timaeus) exhibit Pythagorean ideas. A major revival of his teachings occurred in the first century BC among Middle Platonists, coinciding with the rise of Neopythagoreanism. Pythagoras continued to be regarded as a great philosopher throughout the Middle Ages and Pythagoreanism had an influence on scientists such as Nicolaus Copernicus, Johannes Kepler, and Isaac Newton. Pythagorean symbolism was also used throughout early modern European esotericism, and his teachings as portrayed in Ovid's Metamorphoses would later influence the modern vegetarian movement.

== Life ==
No authentic writings of Pythagoras have survived, and almost nothing is known for certain about his life. The earliest sources on Pythagoras's life, from Xenophanes, Heraclitus, Empedocles, Ion of Chios, and Herodotus are brief, ambiguous, and often satirical. The major sources on Pythagoras's life are three biographies from late antiquity written by Diogenes Laërtius, Porphyry, and Iamblichus, all of which are filled primarily with myths and legends and which become longer and more fantastic in their descriptions of Pythagoras's achievements the more removed they are from Pythagoras's times. However, Porphyry and Iamblichus also used some material taken from earlier writings in the 4th century BC by Aristotle's students Dicaearchus, Aristoxenus, and Heraclides Ponticus, which, when it can be identified, is generally considered to be the most reliable.

=== Early life ===
There is not a single detail in the life of Pythagoras that stands uncontradicted. But it is possible, from a more or less critical selection of the data, to construct a plausible account.

— Walter Burkert, 1972

Herodotus and Isocrates agree that Pythagoras was the son of Mnesarchus and that he was born on the Greek island of Samos in the eastern Aegean. Mnesarchus is said to have been a gem-engraver or a wealthy merchant, but his ancestry is disputed and unclear. (Note: Some writers call him a native Samian, a Tyrrhenian from Lemnos, or a Phliasian from Peloponnesus, and give Marmacus or Demaratus as his name (see Diog VIII, §1.1; Porphyry, Vit. Pyth, §1, §2; Justin, xx. 4; Pausanias, ii. 13; Iamblichus, Vit. Pyth, §2.4). Porphyry, in particular, presents a conflicting report by Neanthes, that Mnesarchus was born in Tyre (in Lebanon), or that he was a Tyrrhenian from Lemnos; however, the confusion was possibly due to the similarity of the names "Tyre" and "Tyrrhenian", while it has also been suggested that Porphyry's own background from Tyre, could explain why his work was the only one, out of the three biographies of Pythagoras that have survived from late antiquity, to have linked Pythagoras's father with it. Due to the obscurity surrounding his background, some modern scholars deem it safer to accept "that Pythagoras and his father were pure-blooded Greeks, of undiluted Samian stock".) Apollonius of Tyana writes that Pythagoras's mother was Pythaïs, a woman who was said to be a descendant of Ancaeus, the mythical founder of Samos. Iamblichus tells the story that the Pythia prophesied to her while she was pregnant with him that she would give birth to a man supremely beautiful, wise, and beneficial to humankind, and Iamblichus also held to the belief that his mother descended from Ancaeus. As to the date of his birth, Aristoxenus stated that Pythagoras left Samos in the reign of Polycrates, at the age of 40, which would give a date of birth around 570 BC. Pythagoras's name led him to be associated with Pythian Apollo (Pūthíā); Aristippus of Cyrene in the 4th century BC explained his name by saying, "He spoke [ἀγορεύω, agoreúō] the truth no less than did the Pythian [πυθικός, puthikós]".

During Pythagoras's formative years, Samos was a thriving cultural hub known for its feats of advanced architectural engineering, including the building of the Tunnel of Eupalinos, and for its riotous festival culture. It was a major center of trade in the Aegean where traders brought goods from the Near East. According to Christiane L. Joost-Gaugier, these traders almost certainly brought with them Near Eastern ideas and traditions. Pythagoras's early life also coincided with the flowering of early Ionian natural philosophy. He was a contemporary of the philosophers Anaximander and Anaximenes and of the historian Hecataeus, all of whom lived in Miletus, across the sea from Samos.

=== Reputed travels ===
Modern scholarship has shown that the culture of Archaic Greece was heavily influenced by those of Levantine and Mesopotamian cultures, which appears to have been recognized by authors later in the Classical and Hellenistic periods, who attributed many of Pythagoras's unusual and unconventional beliefs to travels to far off lands, where he learned from those people himself. The doctrine of metempsychosis, or reincarnation of the soul after death, which Herodotus and Diogenes Laertius had attributed to the Egyptians, led to an elaborate tale where Pythagoras learned the Egyptian language from the Pharaoh Amasis II himself, and then traveled to study with the Egyptian priests at Diospolis (Thebes), where he was the only foreigner ever to be granted the privilege of taking part in their worship. Other ancient writers, however, claimed that Pythagoras had learned these teachings from the Magi in Persia or even from Zoroaster himself. The Phoenicians are also reputed to have taught Pythagoras arithmetic and the Chaldeans to have taught him astronomy. By the third century BC, Pythagoras was also reported to have studied under the Jews as well. By the third century AD, Pythagoras was also reported by Philostratus to have studied under sages or gymnosophists in India and, according to Iamblichus, also with the Celts and Iberians.

=== Alleged Greek teachers ===
Ancient sources also record Pythagoras having studied under a variety of native Greek thinkers. Diogenes Laërtius asserts that Pythagoras later visited Crete, where he went to the Cave of Ida with Epimenides. Some identify Hermodamas of Samos as a possible tutor. Hermodamas represented the indigenous Samian rhapsodic tradition and his father Creophylos was said to have been the host of his rival poet Homer. Others credit Bias of Priene, Thales, or Anaximander (a pupil of Thales). Other traditions claim the mythic bard Orpheus as Pythagoras's teacher, thus representing the Orphic Mysteries. The Neoplatonists wrote of a "sacred discourse" Pythagoras had written on the gods in the Doric Greek dialect, which they believed had been dictated to Pythagoras by the Orphic priest Aglaophamus upon his initiation to the orphic Mysteries at Leibethra. Iamblichus credited Orpheus with having been the model for Pythagoras's manner of speech, his spiritual attitude, and his manner of worship. Iamblichus describes Pythagoreanism as a synthesis of everything Pythagoras had learned from Orpheus, from the Egyptian priests, from the Eleusinian Mysteries, and from other religious and philosophical traditions. Contradicting all these reports, the novelist Antonius Diogenes, writing in the second century BC, reports that Pythagoras discovered all his doctrines himself by interpreting dreams. Riedweg states that, although these stories are fanciful, Pythagoras's teachings were definitely influenced by Orphism to a noteworthy extent.

Of the various Greek sages claimed to have taught Pythagoras, Pherecydes of Syros is mentioned most often. Similar miracle stories were told about both Pythagoras and Pherecydes, including one in which the hero predicts a shipwreck, one in which he predicts the conquest of Messina, and one in which he drinks from a well and predicts an earthquake. Apollonius Paradoxographus, a paradoxographer who may have lived in the second century BC, identified Pythagoras's thaumaturgic ideas as a result of Pherecydes's influence. Another story, which may be traced to the Neopythagorean philosopher Nicomachus, tells that, when Pherecydes was old and dying on the island of Delos, Pythagoras returned to care for him and pay his respects. Duris, the historian and tyrant of Samos, is reported to have patriotically boasted of an epitaph supposedly penned by Pherecydes which declared that Pythagoras's wisdom exceeded his own. On the grounds of all these references connecting Pythagoras with Pherecydes, Riedweg concludes that there may well be some historical foundation to the tradition that Pherecydes was Pythagoras's teacher. Pythagoras and Pherecydes also appear to have shared similar views on the soul and the teaching of metempsychosis.

=== In Croton ===
Map of Italy showing locations associated with Pythagoras

Porphyry repeats an account from Antiphon, who reported that, while he was still on Samos, Pythagoras founded a school known as the "semicircle". Here, Samians debated matters of public concern. Supposedly, the school became so renowned that the brightest minds in all of Greece came to Samos to hear Pythagoras teach. Pythagoras himself dwelled in a secret cave, where he studied in private and occasionally held discourses with a few of his close friends. Christoph Riedweg, a German scholar of early Pythagoreanism, states that it is entirely possible Pythagoras may have taught on Samos, but cautions that Antiphon's account, which makes reference to a specific building that was still in use during his own time, appears to be motivated by Samian patriotic interest.

Around 530 BC, when Pythagoras was about forty years old, he left Samos. His later admirers claimed that he left because he disagreed with the tyranny of Polycrates in Samos; Riedweg notes that this explanation closely aligns with Nicomachus's emphasis on Pythagoras's purported love of freedom, but that Pythagoras's enemies portrayed him as having a proclivity towards tyranny. Other accounts claim that Pythagoras left Samos because he was so overburdened with public duties in Samos, because of the high estimation in which he was held by his fellow-citizens. He arrived in the Greek colony of Croton (today's Crotone, in Calabria) in what was then Magna Graecia. All sources agree that Pythagoras was charismatic and quickly acquired great political influence in his new environment. He served as an advisor to the elites in Croton and gave them frequent advice. Later biographers tell fantastical stories of the effects of his eloquent speeches in leading the people of Croton to abandon their luxurious and corrupt way of life and devote themselves to the purer system which he came to introduce.

=== Family and friends ===
Suda writes that Pythagoras had four children (Telauges, Mnesarchus, Myia and Arignote), and Diogenes Laertius records him as having had two brothers, Eunomus the elder and Tyrrhenus the second. The wrestler Milo of Croton was said to have been a close associate of Pythagoras and was credited with having saved the philosopher's life when a roof was about to collapse. This association may have been the result of confusion with a different man named Pythagoras, who was an athletics trainer.

=== Death ===
Pythagoras's emphasis on dedication and asceticism are credited with aiding in Croton's decisive victory over the neighboring colony of Sybaris in 510 BC. After the victory, some prominent citizens of Croton proposed a democratic constitution, which the Pythagoreans rejected. The supporters of democracy, headed by Cylon and Ninon, the former of whom is said to have been irritated by his exclusion from Pythagoras's brotherhood, roused the populace against them. Followers of Cylon and Ninon attacked the Pythagoreans during one of their meetings, either in the house of Milo or in some other meeting-place. Accounts of the attack are often contradictory and many probably confused it with the later anti-Pythagorean rebellions, such as the one in Metapontum in 454 BC. The building was apparently set on fire, and many of the assembled members perished; only the younger and more active members managed to escape.

Sources disagree regarding whether Pythagoras was present when the attack occurred and, if he was, whether or not he managed to escape. In some accounts, Pythagoras was not at the meeting when the Pythagoreans were attacked because he was on Delos tending to the dying Pherecydes. According to another account from Dicaearchus, Pythagoras was at the meeting and managed to escape, leading a small group of followers to the nearby city of Locris, where they pleaded for sanctuary, but were denied. They reached the city of Metapontum, where they took shelter in the temple of the Muses and died there of starvation after forty days without food. Another tale recorded by Porphyry claims that, as Pythagoras's enemies were burning the house, his devoted students laid down on the ground to make a path for him to escape by walking over their bodies across the flames like a bridge. Pythagoras managed to escape, but was so despondent at the deaths of his beloved students that he committed suicide. A different legend reported by both Diogenes Laërtius and Iamblichus states that Pythagoras almost managed to escape, but that he came to a fava bean field and refused to run through it, since doing so would violate his teachings, so he stopped instead and was killed. This story seems to have originated from the writer Neanthes, who told it about later Pythagoreans, not about Pythagoras himself.

== Teachings ==
=== Metempsychosis ===
Although the exact details of Pythagoras's teachings are uncertain, it is possible to reconstruct a general outline of his main ideas. Aristotle writes at length about the teachings of the Pythagoreans, but without mentioning Pythagoras directly. One of Pythagoras's main doctrines appears to have been metempsychosis, the belief that all souls are immortal and that, after death, a soul is transferred into a new body. This teaching is referenced by Xenophanes, Ion of Chios, and Herodotus. The earliest source on Pythagoras's metempsychosis is a satirical poem probably written after his death by the Greek philosopher Xenophanes of Colophon (c. 570 – c. 478 BC), who had been one of his contemporaries, in which Xenophanes describes Pythagoras interceding on behalf of a dog that is being beaten, professing to recognize in its cries the voice of a departed friend. (Note: Xenophanes's Poem (or Elegies) on Pythagorus is provided below, which was preserved in Diog VIII, §1.36: Greek: περὶ δὲ τοῦ ἄλλοτε ἄλλον γεγενῆσθαι (Pythagoras) Ζενοφάνης ἐν ἐλεγείαι προσμαρτυρεῖ, ἧς ἀρχή 'νῦν ... κέλενθον'. ὃ δὲ περὶ αὐτοῦ (Pythagoras) φησιν, οὕτως ἔχει καί ... αἰών'. νῦν αὖτ' ἄλλον ἔπειμι λόγον, δείξω δὲ κέλευθον. καί ποτέ μιν στυφελιζομένου σκύλακος παριόντα φασὶν ἐποικτῖραι καὶ τόδε φάσθαι ἔπος "παῦσαι μηδὲ ῥάπιζε, ἐπεὶ ἡ φίλου ἀνέρος ἐστὶν ψυχή, τὴν ἔγνων φθεγξαμένης αὐδῆς." DK 21B7, p. 130; English: "And now I will turn to another tale and point the way. ... Once they say that he (Pythagoras) was passing by when a dog was being beaten and spoke this word: "Stop! don't beat it! For it is the soul of a friend that I recognised when I heard its voice." Burnet (1920), p. 118) Nothing whatsoever, however, is known about the nature or mechanism by which Pythagoras believed metempsychosis to occur.

Empedocles alludes in one of his poems that Pythagoras may have claimed to possess the ability to recall his former incarnations. Diogenes Laërtius reports an account from Heraclides Ponticus that Pythagoras told people that he had lived four previous lives that he could remember in detail. The first of these lives was as Aethalides the son of Hermes, who granted him the ability to remember all his past incarnations. Next, he was incarnated as Euphorbus, a minor hero from the Trojan War briefly mentioned in the Iliad. He then became the philosopher Hermotimus, who recognized the shield of Euphorbus in the temple of Apollo. His final incarnation was as Pyrrhus, a fisherman from Delos. One of his past lives, as reported by Dicaearchus, was as a beautiful courtesan.

=== Numerology ===
Pythagoras is credited with having devised the tetractys, an important sacred symbol in later Pythagoreanism.

Another belief attributed to Pythagoras was that of the "harmony of the spheres", which maintained that the planets and stars move according to mathematical equations, which correspond to musical notes and thus produce an inaudible symphony. According to Porphyry, Pythagoras taught that the seven Muses were actually the seven planets singing together.

The so-called Pythagoreans applied themselves to mathematics, and were the first to develop this science; and through studying it they came to believe that its principles are the principles of everything.

— Aristot. Met. 1, 985b

Modern scholars typically ascribe these discoveries to the later Pythagorean philosopher Philolaus of Croton (c. 470 – c. 385 BC), whose extant fragments are the earliest texts to describe the numerological and musical theories that were later ascribed to Pythagoras. In his landmark study Lore and Science in Ancient Pythagoreanism, Walter Burkert argues that Pythagoras was a charismatic political and religious teacher, but that the number philosophy attributed to him was really an innovation by Philolaus. According to Burkert, Pythagoras never dealt with numbers at all, let alone made any noteworthy contribution to mathematics. Burkert argues that the only mathematics the Pythagoreans ever actually engaged in was simple, proofless arithmetic, but that these arithmetic discoveries did contribute significantly to the beginnings of mathematics. For the later Pythagoreans, Pythagoras was credited with devising the tetractys, the triangular figure of four rows which add up to the "perfect" number, ten. The Pythagoreans regarded the tetractys as a symbol of utmost mystical importance. Iamblichus, in his Life of Pythagoras, states that the tetractys was "so admirable, and so divinised by those who understood [it]," that Pythagoras's students would swear oaths by it.

This shouldn't be confused with a simplified version known today as "Pythagorean numerology", involving a variant of an isopsephic technique known – among other names – as pythmenes 'roots' or 'base numbers', by means of which the base values of letters in a word were mathematically reduced by addition or division, in order to obtain a single value from one to nine for the whole name or word.

== Pythagoreanism ==
=== Communal lifestyle ===
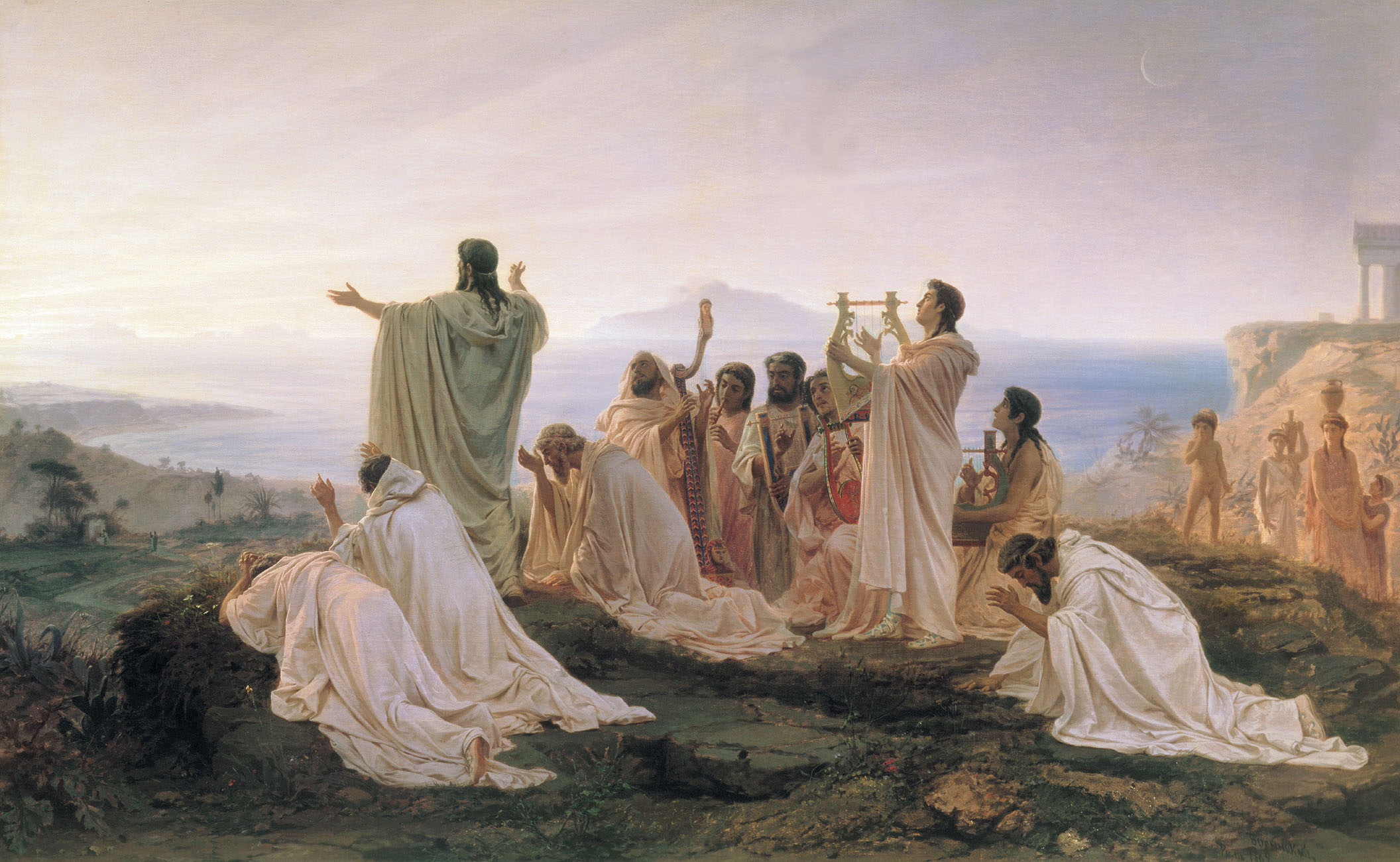
Pythagoreans Celebrate the Sunrise (1869) by Fyodor Bronnikov

Both Plato and Isocrates state that, above all else, Pythagoras was known as the founder of a new way of life. The organization Pythagoras founded at Croton was called a "school", but, in many ways, resembled a monastery. The adherents were bound by a vow to Pythagoras and each other, for the purpose of pursuing the religious and ascetic observances, and of studying his religious and philosophical theories. The members of the sect shared all their possessions in common and were devoted to each other to the exclusion of outsiders. Ancient sources record that the Pythagoreans ate meals in common after the manner of the Spartans. One Pythagorean maxim was "koinà tà phílōn" ("All things in common among friends"). Both Iamblichus and Porphyry provide detailed accounts of the organization of the school, although the primary interest of both writers is not historical accuracy, but rather to present Pythagoras as a divine figure, sent by the gods to benefit mankind. Iamblichus, in particular, presents the "Pythagorean Way of Life" as a pagan alternative to the Christian monastic communities of his own time. For Pythagoreans, the highest reward humans could attain was for their soul to join in the life of the gods and thus escape the cycle of reincarnation.

Two groups existed within early Pythagoreanism: the mathematikoi ("learners") and the akousmatikoi ("listeners"). The akousmatikoi are traditionally identified by scholars as "old believers" in mysticism, numerology, and religious teachings; whereas the mathematikoi are traditionally identified as a more intellectual, modernist faction who were more rationalist and scientific. Gregory cautions that there was probably not a sharp distinction between them and that many Pythagoreans probably believed the two approaches were compatible. The study of mathematics and music may have been connected to the worship of Apollo. The Pythagoreans believed that music was a purification for the soul, just as medicine was a purification for the body. One anecdote of Pythagoras reports that when he encountered some drunken youths trying to break into the home of a virtuous woman, he sang a solemn tune with long spondees and the boys' "raging willfulness" was quelled. The Pythagoreans also placed particular emphasis on the importance of physical exercise; therapeutic dancing, daily morning walks along scenic routes, and athletics were major components of the Pythagorean lifestyle. Moments of contemplation at the beginning and end of each day were also advised.

=== Prohibitions and regulations ===
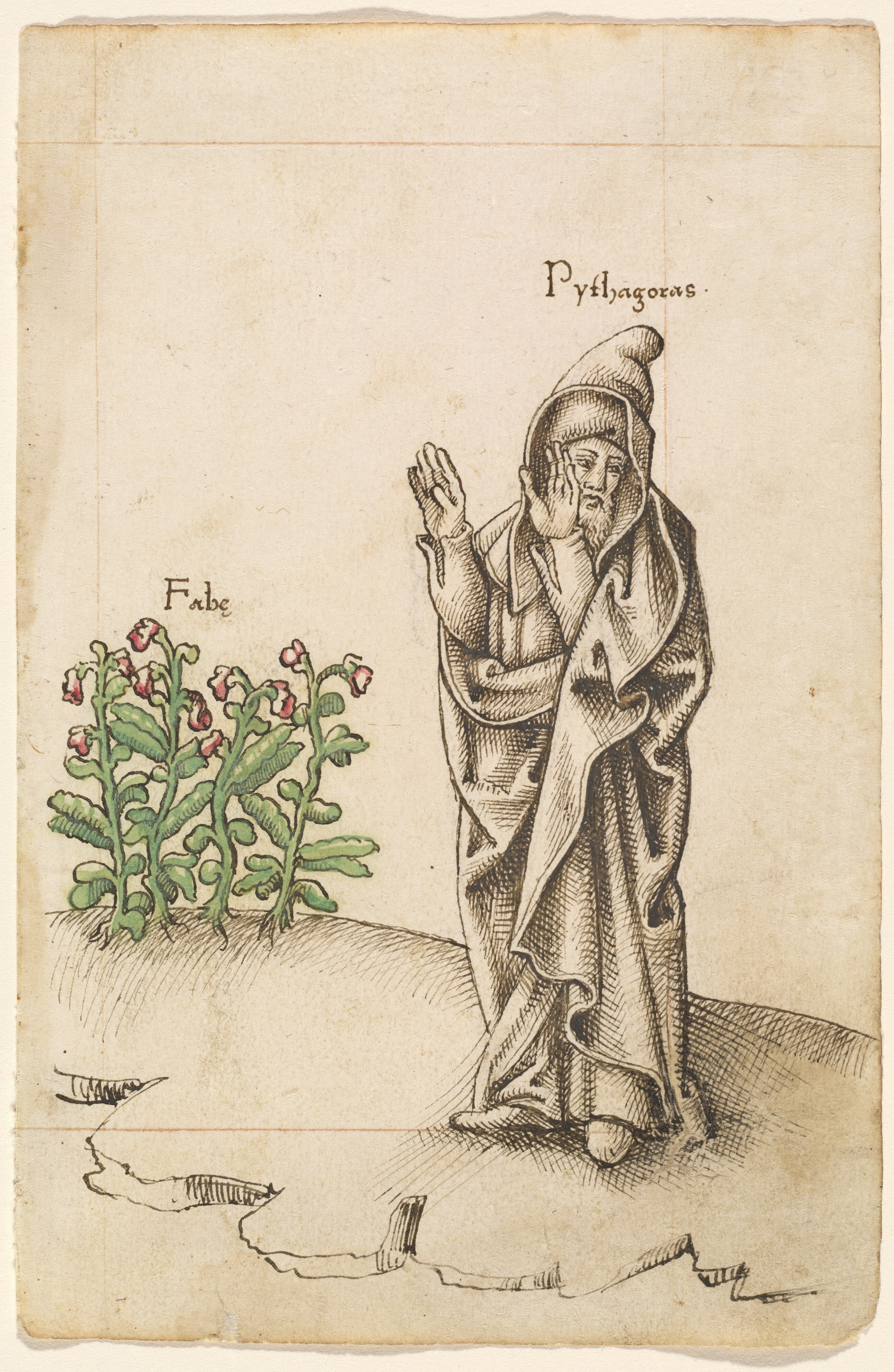
French manuscript from 1512/1514, showing Pythagoras turning his face away from fava beans in revulsion

Pythagorean teachings were known as "symbols" (symbola) and members took a vow of silence that they would not reveal these symbols to non-members. Those who did not obey the laws of the community were expelled and the remaining members would erect tombstones for them as though they had died. A number of "oral sayings" (akoúsmata) attributed to Pythagoras have survived, dealing with how members of the Pythagorean community should perform sacrifices, how they should honor the gods, how they should "move from here", and how they should be buried. Many of these sayings emphasize the importance of ritual purity and avoiding defilement. Other extant oral sayings forbid Pythagoreans from breaking bread, poking fires with swords, or picking up crumbs and teach that a person should always put the right sandal on before the left. The exact meanings of these sayings, however, are frequently obscure. Iamblichus preserves Aristotle's descriptions of the original, ritualistic intentions behind a few of these sayings, but these apparently later fell out of fashion, because Porphyry provides markedly different ethical-philosophical interpretations of them:

Pythagorean saying	Original ritual purpose according to Aristotle/Iamblichus	Porphyry's philosophical interpretation
"Do not take roads traveled by the public."	"Fear of being defiled by the impure"	"with this he forbade following the opinions of the masses, yet to follow the ones of the few and the educated".
"and [do] not wear images of the gods on rings"	"Fear of defiling them by wearing them."	"One should not have the teaching and knowledge of the gods quickly at hand and visible [for everyone], nor communicate them to the masses."
"and pour libations for the gods from a drinking cup's handle [the 'ear']"	"Efforts to keep the divine and the human strictly separate"	"thereby he enigmatically hints that the gods should be honored and praised with music; for it goes through the ears".

New initiates were allegedly not permitted to meet Pythagoras until after they had completed a five-year initiation period, during which they were required to remain silent. Sources indicate that Pythagoras himself was unusually progressive in his attitudes towards women and female members of Pythagoras's school appear to have played an active role in its operations. Iamblichus provides a list of 235 famous Pythagoreans, seventeen of whom are women. In later times, many prominent female philosophers contributed to the development of Neopythagoreanism.

Pythagoreanism also entailed a number of dietary prohibitions. It is more or less agreed that Pythagoras issued a prohibition against the consumption of fava beans and the meat of non-sacrificial animals such as fish and poultry. Both of these assumptions, however, have been contradicted. Pythagorean dietary restrictions may have been motivated by belief in the doctrine of metempsychosis; alternatively, they may be based on the genetic prevalence of favism, a type of enzyme deficiency anemia, in the Mediterranean. Some ancient writers present Pythagoras as enforcing a strictly vegetarian diet. (Note: as Empedocles did afterwards, Aristotle, Rhet. i. 14. § 2; Sextus Empiricus, ix. 127. This was also one of the Orphic precepts, Aristoph. Ran. 1032) Eudoxus of Cnidus, a student of Archytas, writes, "Pythagoras was distinguished by such purity and so avoided killing and killers that he not only abstained from animal foods, but even kept his distance from cooks and hunters." Other authorities contradict this statement. According to Aristoxenus, Pythagoras allowed the use of all kinds of animal food except the flesh of oxen used for ploughing, and rams. According to Heraclides Ponticus, Pythagoras ate the meat from sacrifices and established a diet for athletes dependent on meat.

== Legends ==
Within his own lifetime, Pythagoras was already the subject of elaborate hagiographic legends. Aristotle described Pythagoras as a wonder-worker and somewhat of a supernatural figure. In a fragment, Aristotle writes that Pythagoras had a golden thigh, which he publicly exhibited at the Olympic Games and showed to Abaris the Hyperborean as proof of his identity as the "Hyperborean Apollo". Supposedly, the priest of Apollo gave Pythagoras a magic arrow, which he used to fly over long distances and perform ritual purifications. He was supposedly once seen at both Metapontum and Croton at the same time. When Pythagoras crossed the river Kosas (the modern-day Basento), "several witnesses" reported that they heard it greet him by name. In Roman times, a legend claimed that Pythagoras was the son of Apollo.

Pythagoras was said to have dressed all in white. He is also said to have borne a golden wreath atop his head and to have worn trousers after the fashion of the Thracians. Pythagoras was said to have had extraordinary success in dealing with animals. A fragment from Aristotle records that, when a deadly snake bit Pythagoras, he bit it back and killed it. Both Porphyry and Iamblichus report that Pythagoras once persuaded a bull not to eat fava beans and that he once convinced a notoriously destructive bear to swear that it would never harm a living thing again, and that the bear kept its word. Riedweg suggests that Pythagoras may have personally encouraged these legends, but Gregory states that there is no direct evidence of this.

== Attributed discoveries ==
=== In mathematics ===
The Pythagorean theorem: The sum of the areas of the two squares on the legs (a and b) equals the area of the square on the hypotenuse (c).

Although Pythagoras is most famous today for his alleged mathematical discoveries, classical historians dispute whether he himself ever actually made any significant contributions to the field. Many mathematical and scientific discoveries were attributed to Pythagoras, such as the Pythagorean theorem, as well as discoveries in the fields of music, astronomy, and medicine. Since at least the first century BC, Pythagoras has commonly been given credit for discovering the Pythagorean theorem, a theorem in geometry that states that "in a right-angled triangle the square of the hypotenuse is equal [to the sum of] the squares of the two other sides"—that is, $a^2 + b^2 = c^2$. According to a popular legend, after he discovered this theorem, Pythagoras sacrificed an ox, or possibly even a whole hecatomb, to the gods. Cicero rejected this story as spurious because of the much more widely held belief that Pythagoras forbade blood sacrifices. Porphyry attempted to explain the story by asserting that the ox was actually made of dough.

The geometric principles underlying the Pythagorean theorem were known and used in earlier traditions. They appear in Babylonian mathematics, such as the Plimpton 322 tablet, and were explicitly formulated in ancient India by Baudhayana as the bhujā-koṭi-karṇa-nyāya 'rule of the diagonal', in the Baudhayana Sulbsutra (c. 800–500 BC). Burkert rejects the suggestion that Pythagoras had anything to do with the theorem, noting that Pythagoras was never credited with having proved any theorem in antiquity. Riedweg stresses that "there is certainly no reason to suppose that either Pythagoras himself or any early Pythagorean could have provided a deductive proof of the theorem". Furthermore, the manner in which the Babylonians employed Pythagorean numbers implies that they knew that the principle was generally applicable, and knew some kind of proof, which has not yet been found in the (still largely unpublished) cuneiform sources. (Note: There are about 100,000 unpublished cuneiform sources in the British Museum alone. Babylonian knowledge of proof of the Pythagorean theorem is discussed by J. Høyrup, 'The Pythagorean "Rule" and "Theorem" – Mirror of the Relation between Babylonian and Greek Mathematics,' in: J. Renger (red.): Babylon. Focus mesopotamischer Geschichte, Wiege früher Gelehrsamkeit, Mythos in der Moderne (1999).)

=== In music ===
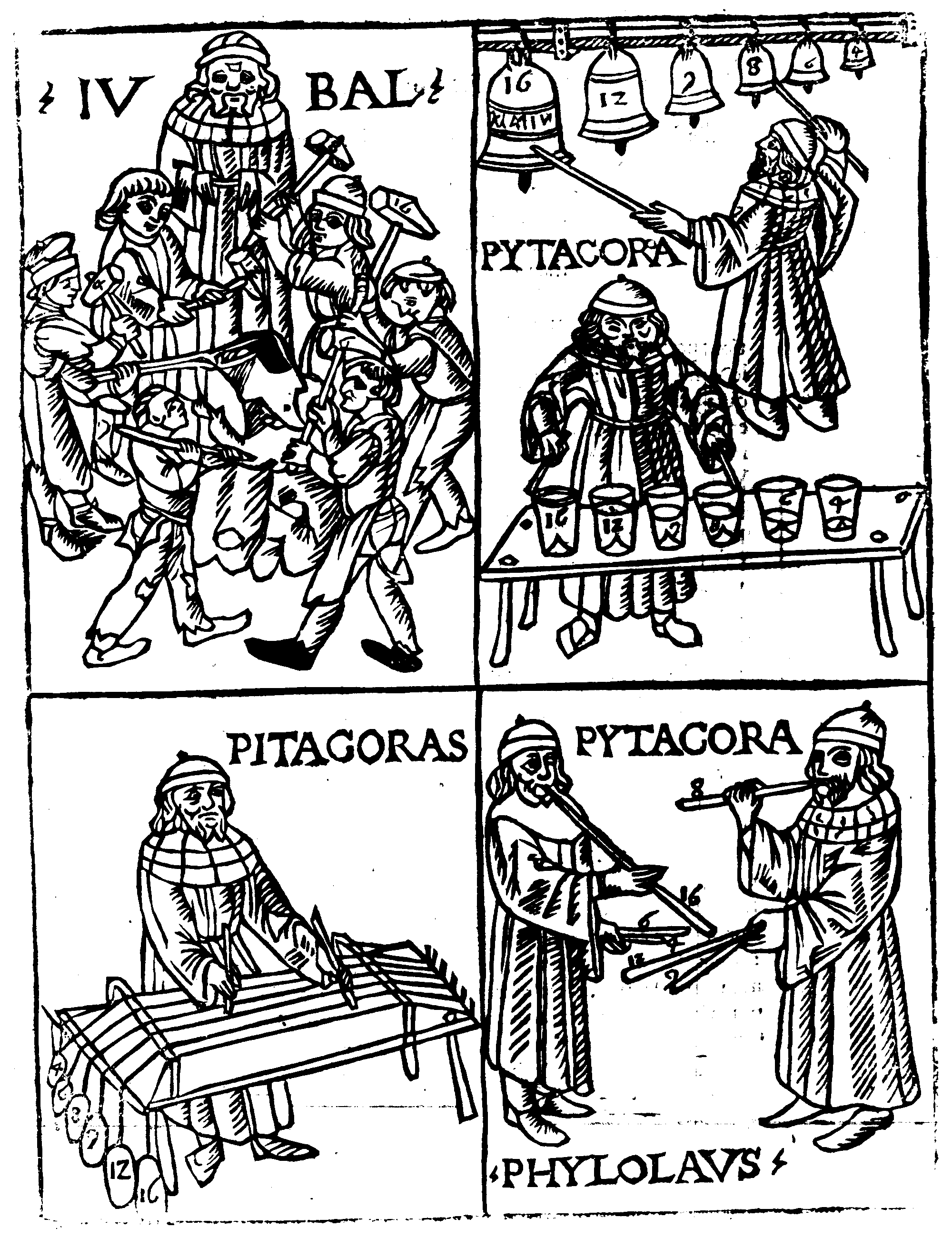
Late medieval woodcut from Franchino Gafurio's Theoria musice (1492), showing Pythagoras with bells and other instruments in Pythagorean tuning

According to legend, Pythagoras discovered that musical notes could be translated into mathematical equations when he passed blacksmiths at work one day and heard the sound of their hammers clanging against the anvils. Thinking that the sounds of the hammers were beautiful and harmonious, except for one, he rushed into the blacksmith shop and began testing the hammers. He then realized that the tune played when the hammer struck was directly proportional to the size of the hammer and therefore concluded that music was mathematical.

=== In astronomy ===
In ancient times, Pythagoras and his contemporary Parmenides of Elea were both credited with having been the first to teach that the Earth was spherical, the first to divide the globe into five climatic zones, and the first to identify the morning star and the evening star as the same celestial object (now known as Venus). Of the two philosophers, Parmenides has a much stronger claim to having been the first and the attribution of these discoveries to Pythagoras seems to have possibly originated from a pseudepigraphal poem. Empedocles, who lived in Magna Graecia shortly after Pythagoras and Parmenides, knew that the earth was spherical. By the end of the fifth century BC, this fact was universally accepted among Greek intellectuals.

== Later influence in antiquity ==
=== On Greek philosophy ===
Sizeable Pythagorean communities existed in Magna Graecia, Phlius, and Thebes during the early fourth century BC. Around the same time, the Pythagorean philosopher Archytas was highly influential on the politics of the city of Tarentum in Magna Graecia. According to later tradition, Archytas was elected as strategos ("general") seven times, even though others were prohibited from serving more than a year. Archytas was also a renowned mathematician and musician. He was a close friend of Plato and he is quoted in Plato's Republic. Aristotle states that the philosophy of Plato was heavily dependent on the teachings of the Pythagoreans. Cicero repeats this statement, remarking that Platonem ferunt didicisse Pythagorea omnia ("They say Plato learned all things Pythagorean"). According to Charles H. Kahn, Plato's middle dialogues, including Meno, Phaedo, and The Republic, have a strong "Pythagorean coloring", and his last few dialogues (particularly Philebus and Timaeus) are extremely Pythagorean in character.

The poet Heraclitus of Ephesus (fl. c. 500 BC), who was born a few miles across the sea from Samos and may have lived within Pythagoras's lifetime, mocked Pythagoras as a clever charlatan, remarking that "Pythagoras, son of Mnesarchus, practiced inquiry more than any other man, and selecting from these writings he manufactured a wisdom for himself—much learning, artful knavery." Alcmaeon of Croton (fl. c. 450 BC), a doctor who lived in Croton at around the same time Pythagoras lived there, incorporates many Pythagorean teachings into his writings and alludes to having possibly known Pythagoras personally. The Greek poets Ion of Chios (c. 480 – c. 421 BC) and Empedocles of Acragas (c. 493 – c. 432 BC) both express admiration for Pythagoras in their poems.

According to R. M. Hare, Plato's Republic may be partially based on the "tightly organised community of like-minded thinkers" established by Pythagoras at Croton. Additionally, Plato may have borrowed from Pythagoras the idea that mathematics and abstract thought are a secure basis for philosophy, science, and morality. Plato and Pythagoras shared a "mystical approach to the soul and its place in the material world" and both were probably influenced by Orphism. The historian of philosophy Frederick Copleston states that Plato probably borrowed his tripartite theory of the soul from the Pythagoreans.

A revival of Pythagorean teachings occurred in the first century BC when Middle Platonist philosophers such as Eudorus and Philo of Alexandria hailed the rise of a "new" Pythagoreanism in Alexandria. At around the same time, Neopythagoreanism became prominent. The first-century AD philosopher Apollonius of Tyana sought to emulate Pythagoras and live by Pythagorean teachings. The later first-century Neopythagorean philosopher Moderatus of Gades expanded on Pythagorean number philosophy and probably understood the soul as a "kind of mathematical harmony". The Neopythagorean mathematician and musicologist Nicomachus likewise expanded on Pythagorean numerology and music theory. Numenius of Apamea interpreted Plato's teachings in light of Pythagorean doctrines.

=== On art and architecture ===
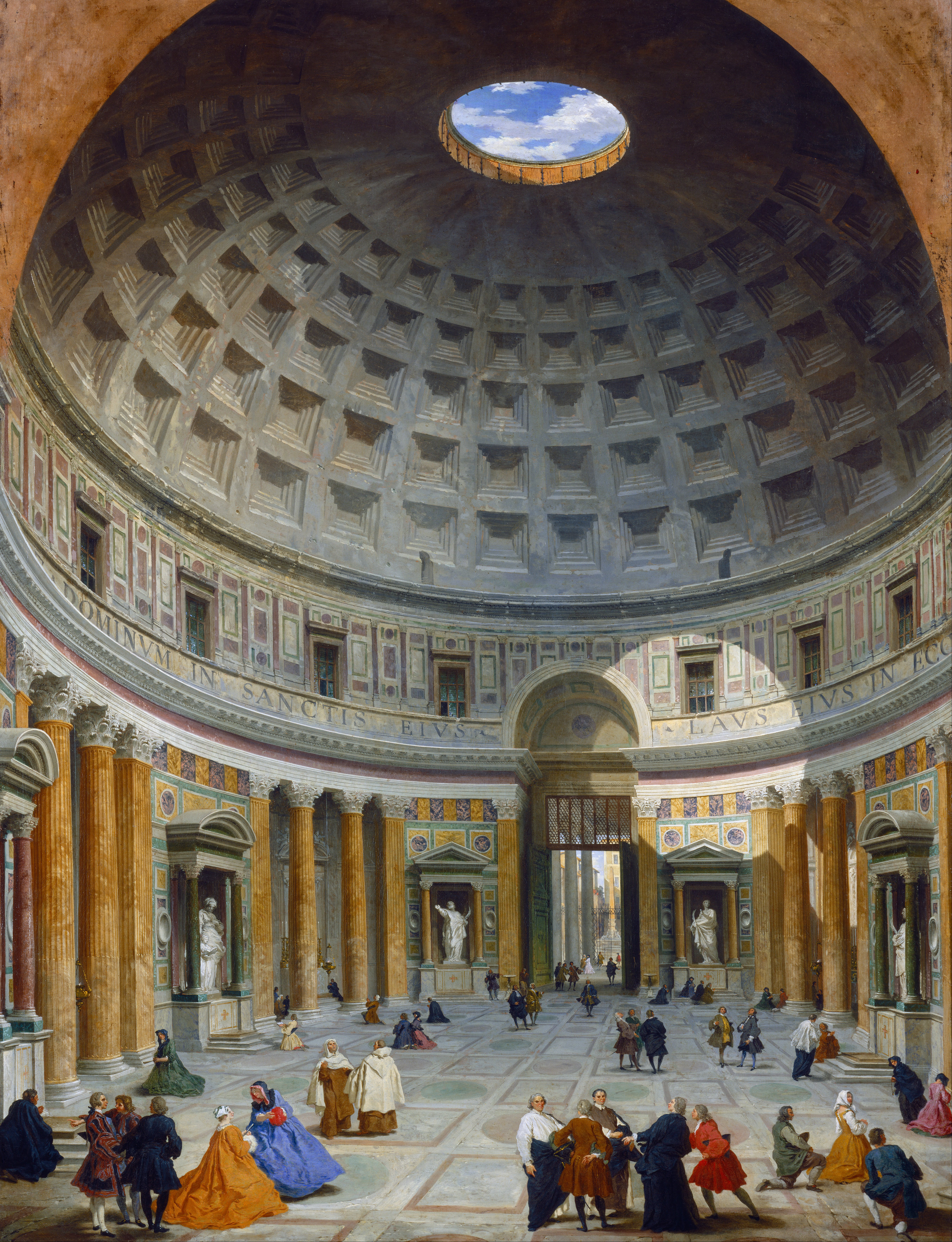
Hadrian's Pantheon in Rome, depicted in this eighteenth-century painting by Giovanni Paolo Panini, was built according to Pythagorean teachings.

The oldest known building designed according to Pythagorean teachings is the Porta Maggiore Basilica, a subterranean basilica which was built during the reign of the Roman emperor Nero as a secret place of worship for Pythagoreans. The basilica was built underground because of the Pythagorean emphasis on secrecy and also because of the legend that Pythagoras had sequestered himself in a cave on Samos. The basilica's apse is in the east and its atrium in the west out of respect for the rising sun. It has a narrow entrance leading to a small pool where the initiates could purify themselves. The building is also designed according to Pythagorean numerology, with each table in the sanctuary providing seats for seven people. Three aisles lead to a single altar, symbolizing the three parts of the soul approaching the unity of Apollo. The apse depicts a scene of the poet Sappho leaping off the Leucadian cliffs, clutching her lyre to her breast, while Apollo stands beneath her, extending his right hand in a gesture of protection, symbolizing Pythagorean teachings about the immortality of the soul. The interior of the sanctuary is almost entirely white because the color white was regarded by Pythagoreans as sacred.

The emperor Hadrian's Pantheon in Rome was also built based on Pythagorean numerology. The temple's circular plan, central axis, hemispherical dome, and alignment with the four cardinal directions symbolize Pythagorean views on the order of the universe. The single oculus at the top of the dome symbolizes the monad and the sun-god Apollo. The twenty-eight ribs extending from the oculus symbolize the moon, because twenty-eight was the same number of months on the Pythagorean lunar calendar. The five coffered rings beneath the ribs represent the marriage of the sun and moon.

=== In early Christianity ===
Many early Christians had a deep respect for Pythagoras. Eusebius (c. 260 – c. 340 AD), bishop of Caesarea, praises Pythagoras in his Against Hierokles for his rule of silence, his frugality, his "extraordinary" morality, and his wise teachings. In another work, Eusebius compares Pythagoras to Moses. In one of his letters, the Church Father Jerome (c. 347 – c. 420 AD) praises Pythagoras for his wisdom and, in another letter, he credits Pythagoras for his belief in the immortality of the soul, which he suggests Christians inherited from him. Augustine of Hippo (354–430 AD) rejected Pythagoras's teaching of metempsychosis without explicitly naming him, but otherwise expressed admiration for him. In On the Trinity, Augustine lauds the fact that Pythagoras was humble enough to call himself a philosophos or "lover of wisdom" rather than a "sage". In another passage, Augustine defends Pythagoras's reputation, arguing that Pythagoras certainly never taught the doctrine of metempsychosis.

== Influence after antiquity ==
=== In the Middle Ages ===
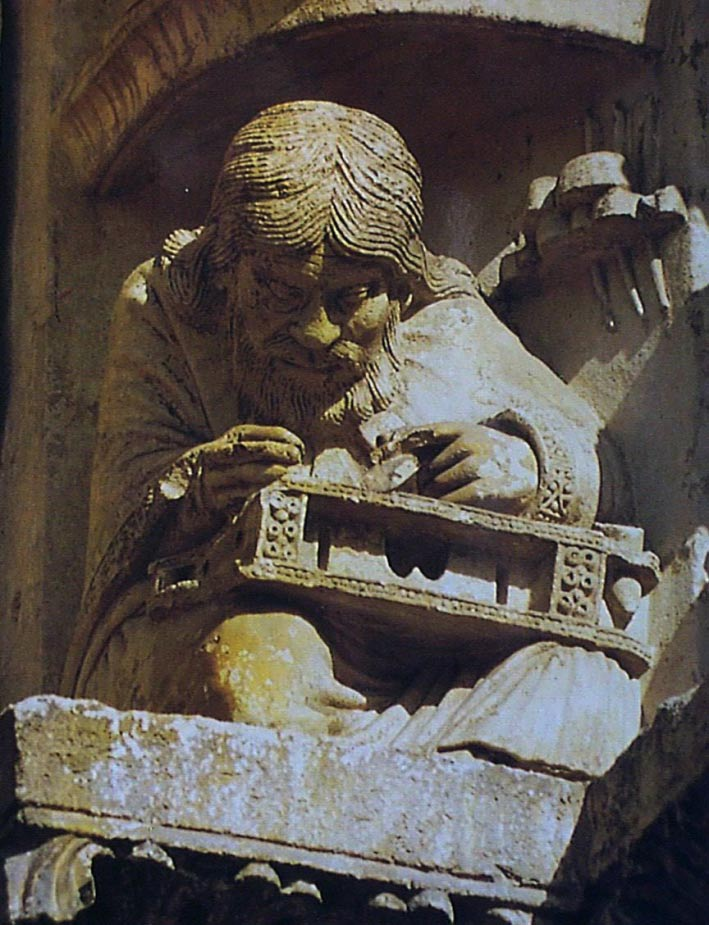
Pythagoras appears in a relief sculpture on one of the archivolts over the right door of the west portal at Chartres Cathedral.

During the Middle Ages, Pythagoras was revered as the founder of mathematics and music, two of the Seven Liberal Arts. He appears in numerous medieval depictions, in illuminated manuscripts and in the relief sculptures on the portal of the Cathedral of Chartres. The Timaeus was the only dialogue of Plato to survive in Latin translation in western Europe, which led William of Conches (c. 1080–1160) to declare that Plato was Pythagorean. In the 1430s, the Camaldolese friar Ambrose Traversari translated Diogenes Laërtius's Lives and Opinions of Eminent Philosophers from Greek into Latin and, in the 1460s, the philosopher Marsilio Ficino translated Porphyry and Iamblichus's Lives of Pythagoras into Latin as well, thereby allowing them to be read and studied by western scholars. In 1494, the Greek Neopythagorean scholar Constantine Lascaris published The Golden Verses of Pythagoras, translated into Latin, with a printed edition of his Grammatica, thereby bringing them to a widespread audience. In 1499, he published the first Renaissance biography of Pythagoras in his work Vitae illustrium philosophorum siculorum et calabrorum, issued in Messina.

=== On modern science ===
In his preface to his book On the Revolution of the Heavenly Spheres (1543), Nicolaus Copernicus cites various Pythagoreans as the most important influences on the development of his heliocentric model of the universe, deliberately omitting mention of Aristarchus of Samos, a non-Pythagorean astronomer who had developed a fully heliocentric model in the fourth century BC, in effort to portray his model as fundamentally Pythagorean. Johannes Kepler considered himself to be a Pythagorean. He believed in the Pythagorean doctrine of musica universalis and it was his search for the mathematical equations behind this doctrine that led to his discovery of the laws of planetary motion. Kepler titled his book on the subject Harmonices Mundi (Harmonics of the World), after the Pythagorean teaching that had inspired him. He also called Pythagoras the "grandfather" of all Copernicans.

Albert Einstein believed that a scientist may also be "a Platonist or a Pythagorean insofar as he considers the viewpoint of logical simplicity as an indispensable and effective tool of his research." The English philosopher Alfred North Whitehead argued that "In a sense, Plato and Pythagoras stand nearer to modern physical science than does Aristotle. The two former were mathematicians, whereas Aristotle was the son of a doctor". By this measure, Whitehead declared that Einstein and other modern scientists like him are "following the pure Pythagorean tradition."

=== On vegetarianism ===
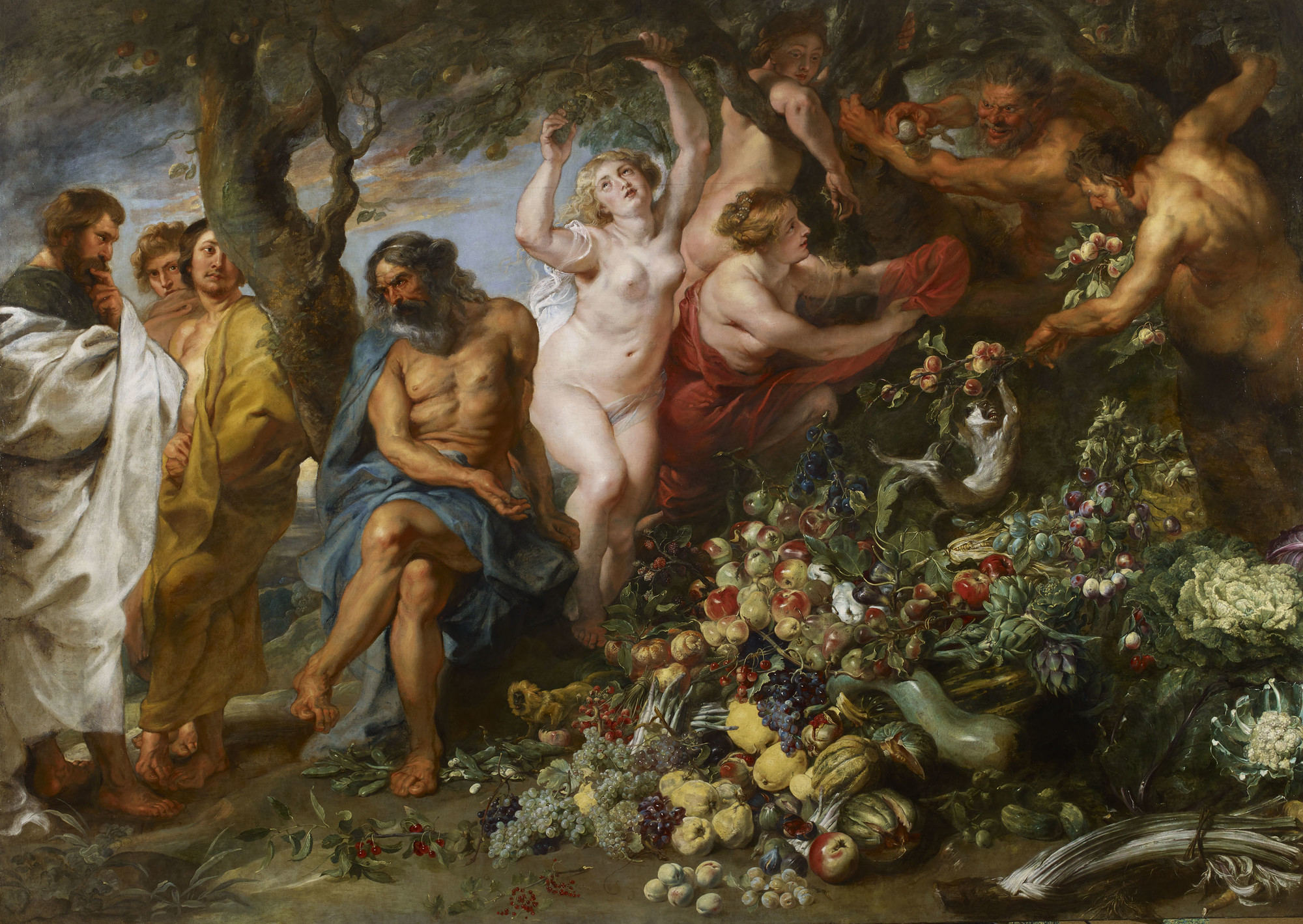
Pythagoras Advocating Vegetarianism (1618–1630) by Peter Paul Rubens was inspired by Pythagoras's speech in Ovid's Metamorphoses. The painting portrays the Pythagoreans with corpulent bodies, indicating a belief that vegetarianism was healthful and nutritious.

A fictionalized portrayal of Pythagoras appears in Book XV of Ovid's Metamorphoses, in which he delivers a speech imploring his followers to adhere to a strictly vegetarian diet. It was through Arthur Golding's 1567 English translation of Ovid's Metamorphoses that Pythagoras was best known to English-speakers throughout the early modern period. John Donne's Progress of the Soul discusses the implications of the doctrines expounded in the speech, and Michel de Montaigne quoted the speech no less than three times in his treatise "Of Cruelty" to voice his moral objections against the mistreatment of animals. John Dryden included a translation of the scene with Pythagoras in his 1700 work Fables, Ancient and Modern, and John Gay's 1726 fable "Pythagoras and the Countryman" reiterates its major themes, linking carnivorism with tyranny. Lord Chesterfield records that his conversion to vegetarianism had been motivated by reading Pythagoras's speech in Ovid's Metamorphoses. Until the word vegetarianism was coined in the 1840s, vegetarians were referred to in English as "Pythagoreans".

=== On Western esotericism ===
Early modern European esotericism drew heavily on the teachings of Pythagoras. The German humanist scholar Johannes Reuchlin (1455–1522) synthesized Pythagoreanism with Christian theology and Jewish Kabbalah, arguing that Kabbalah and Pythagoreanism were both inspired by Mosaic tradition and that Pythagoras was therefore a kabbalist. In his dialogue De verbo mirifico (1494), Reuchlin compared the Pythagorean tetractys to the ineffable divine name YHWH, ascribing each of the four letters of the tetragrammaton a symbolic meaning according to Pythagorean mystical teachings.

Heinrich Cornelius Agrippa's popular and influential three-volume treatise De Occulta Philosophia cites Pythagoras as a "religious magi" and advances the idea that Pythagoras's mystical numerology operates on a supercelestial level, a religious term used to describe a high heavenly realm used during his time. The freemasons deliberately modeled their society on the community founded by Pythagoras at Croton. Rosicrucianism used Pythagorean symbolism, as did Robert Fludd (1574–1637), who believed his own musical writings to have been inspired by Pythagoras. John Dee was heavily influenced by Pythagorean ideology, particularly the teaching that all things are made of numbers.

=== On literature ===
The Transcendentalists read the ancient Lives of Pythagoras as guides on how to live a model life. Henry David Thoreau was impacted by Thomas Taylor's translations of Iamblichus's Life of Pythagoras and Stobaeus's Pythagoric Sayings and his views on nature may have been influenced by the Pythagorean idea of images corresponding to archetypes. The Pythagorean teaching of musica universalis is a recurring theme throughout Thoreau's magnum opus, Walden.

== See also ==
- List of things named after Pythagoras
- Ex pede Herculem, "from his foot, [we can measure] Hercules" – a maxim based on the apocryphal story that Pythagoras estimated Hercules's stature based on the length of a racecourse at Pisae
- Pythagorean cup – a prank cup with a hidden siphon built in, attributed to Pythagoras
- Pythagorean means – the arithmetic mean, the geometric mean, and the harmonic mean, claimed to have been studied by Pythagoras

== Bibliography ==
=== Classical sources ===
- Xenophanes (1960) [c. 525 BC]. "Xenophanes: Leben und Lehre (Life and Teachings)". In Walther, Kranz (ed.). Die Fragmente der Vorsokratiker. Vol. I. Translated by Hermann, Diels (9th ed.). Berlin: Weidmannsche Verlagsbuchhandlung. p. 130. OCLC 1072633182 – via Internet Archive.. [The original Greek fragments of Xenophanes are provided, which are primarily preserved through the work of Diogenes (Diog VIII). For English translation see Burnet (1920).]
- ——— (1920) [c. 525 BC]. "Science and Religion". Early Greek Philosophy. Translated by Burnet, John (3rd ed.). London: A. & C. Black, Ltd. p. 118. OCLC 3610194 – via Internet Archive.. [An English translation of DK 21B7.]
- Herodotus (1920) [c. 430 BC]. "Book II". The Persian Wars. Vol. I. Translated by Godley, A. D. Loeb Classical Library. Cambridge, Massachusetts and London: Harvard University Press and William Heinemann Ltd. OCLC 966656476 – via Perseus Digital Library (perseus.tufts.edu).
- ——— (1920) [c. 430 BC]. "Book IV". The Persian Wars. Vol. II. Translated by Godley, A. D. Loeb Classical Library. Cambridge, Massachusetts and London: Harvard University Press and William Heinemann Ltd. OCLC 966656315 – via Perseus Digital Library (perseus.tufts.edu).
- Plato (1969) [c. 380 BC]. "Republic". Plato in Twelve Volumes, Vols. 5 & 6. Translated by Shorey, Paul. Loeb Classical Library. Cambridge, Massachusetts and London: Harvard University Press and William Heinemann Ltd. ISBN 978-0-674-99304-4. OCLC 6947747 – via Perseus Digital Library (perseus.tufts.edu).
- Aristotle (2017) [c. 350 BC]. Johnson, Monte Ransome; Hutchinson, D. S (eds.). "Protrepticus". Archived from the original on 12 May 2024 – via PhilPapers.
- ——— (1931) [c. 350 BC]. "De Anima". In Ross, W.D. (ed.). The Works of Aristotle Translated into English. Vol. 3. Translated by Smith, J. A. Oxford: Oxford University Press. OCLC 237147799 – via The Internet Classics Archive (classics.mit.edu).
- ——— (1933) [c. 350 BC]. "Book I". Metaphysics Books I–IX. Vol. XVII. Translated by Tredennick, Hugh. Loeb Classical Library. Cambridge, Massachusetts and London: Harvard University Press and William Heinemann Ltd. OCLC 958278244 – via Perseus Digital Library (perseus.tufts.edu).
- Cicero (1928) [c. 52 BC]. "De Re Publica". On the Republic. On the Laws (De Re Publica. De Legibus). Vol. XVI. Translated by Keyes, Clinton W. Loeb Classical Library. Cambridge, Massachusetts and London: Harvard University Press and William Heinemann Ltd. OCLC 298443420 – via Internet Archive.
- ——— (1928) [c. 52 BC]. "De Legibus". On the Republic. On the Laws (De Re Publica. De Legibus). Vol. XVI. Translated by Keyes, Clinton W. Loeb Classical Library. Cambridge, Massachusetts and London: Harvard University Press and William Heinemann Ltd. OCLC 298443420 – via Internet Archive.
- ——— (1914) [c. 45 BC]. On the Ends of Good and Evil (De Finibus Bonorum et Malorum). Vol. XVII. Translated by H., Rackham. Loeb Classical Library. Cambridge, Massachusetts and London: Harvard University Press and William Heinemann Ltd. OCLC 298443420 – via LacusCurtius.
- ——— (1923) [c. 45 BC]. Tusculan Disputations (Tusculanae Disputationes). Vol. XVIII. Translated by J.E., King. Loeb Classical Library. Cambridge, Massachusetts and London: Harvard University Press and William Heinemann Ltd. OCLC 298443420 – via Internet Archive.
- ——— (1927) [c. 44 BC]. "De Divinatione I". On Old Age. On Friendship. On Divination (De Senectute, De Amicitia, De Divinatione). Vol. XX. Translated by W. A., Falconer. Loeb Classical Library. Cambridge, Massachusetts and London: Harvard University Press and William Heinemann Ltd. OCLC 298443420 – via Internet Archive.
- ——— (1913) [c. 44 BC]. On Duties (De officiis). Vol. XXI. Translated by Miller, Walter. Loeb Classical Library. Cambridge, Massachusetts and London: Harvard University Press and William Heinemann Ltd. OCLC 298443420 – via Internet Archive.
- Plutarch (1962) [c. 100 AD]. "On Isis and Osiris (De Iside Et Osiride)". Plutarch's Moralia. Vol. V. Translated by Babbitt, Frank Cole. Loeb Classical Library. Cambridge, Massachusetts and London: Harvard University Press and William Heinemann Ltd. OCLC 13897903 – via Internet Archive.
- ——— (1968) [c. 100 AD]. "On the Signs of Socrates (De Genio Socratis)". Plutarch's Moralia. Vol. VII. Translated by De Lacy, Phillip H.; Einarson, Benedict. Loeb Classical Library. Cambridge, Massachusetts and London: Harvard University Press and William Heinemann Ltd. OCLC 938641243 – via Internet Archive.
- ——— (1957) [c. 100 AD]. "On the Eating of Flesh (Du Esu Carnium)". Plutarch's Moralia. Vol. XII. Translated by Helmbold, William C.; Cherniss, Harold. Loeb Classical Library. Cambridge, Massachusetts and London: Harvard University Press and William Heinemann Ltd – via Internet Archive.
- ——— (1967) [c. 100 AD]. "That Epicurus Actually Makes a Pleasant Life Impossible (Non posse suaviter vivi secundum Epicurum)". Plutarch's Moralia. Vol. XIV. Translated by Einarson, Benedict; de Lacy, Phillip H. Loeb Classical Library. Cambridge, Massachusetts and London: Harvard University Press and William Heinemann Ltd – via Internet Archive.
- Apuleius (1970) [c. 150 AD]. "Apologia". The Apologia and Florida of Apuleius of Madaura. Translated by Harold Edgeworth, Butler. Westport, Conn.: Greenwood Press. ISBN 978-0-8371-3066-8. OCLC 313541 – via Internet Archive.. [Which claims Zoroaster taught Pythagoras, also found in Strom, 1.15.]
- Diogenes Laërtius (1925) [c. 200 AD]. "Book I". Lives of the Eminent Philosophers. Vol. I. Translated by Hicks, Robert Drew. Loeb Classical Library. Cambridge, Massachusetts and London: Harvard University Press and William Heinemann Ltd. OCLC 908430780 – via Wikisource.
- ——— (1925) [c. 200 AD]. "Book VIII". Lives of the Eminent Philosophers. Vol. II. Translated by Hicks, Robert Drew. Loeb Classical Library. Cambridge, Massachusetts and London: Harvard University Press and William Heinemann Ltd. OCLC 758307224 – via Wikisource.
- Clement of Alexandria (1991) [c. 200 AD]. "Book I, Chapter XV". Stromateis (Miscellanies). The Fathers of the Church. Vol. 86. Translated by John, Ferguson. Washington, D.C.: Catholic University of America Press. ISBN 978-0-8132-1185-5. OCLC 647919762 – via Internet Archive.
- Porphyry (1987) [c. 270 AD]. "Vita Pythagorae (Life of Pythagoras)". In Fideler, David R. (ed.). The Pythagorean Sourcebook And Library. Translated by Guthrie, Kenneth Sylvan. Michigan: Phanes Press. ISBN 978-0-933999-50-3. OCLC 16130530 – via Internet Archive.
- Iamblichus (1987) [c. 300 AD]. "De Vita Pythagorica (On the Pythagorean Life)". In Fideler, David R. (ed.). The Pythagorean Sourcebook And Library. Translated by Guthrie, Kenneth Sylvan. Michigan: Phanes Press. ISBN 978-0-933999-50-3. OCLC 16130530 – via Internet Archive.
- Hierocles of Alexandria (1995) [c. 430 AD]. "Golden Verses of Pythagoras". The Pythagorean Golden Verses: With Introduction and Commentary. Religions in the Graeco-Roman World. Vol. 123. Translated by Thom, Johan C. Leiden: E.J. Brill. ISBN 978-90-04-10105-0. OCLC 31131998 – via Internet Archive.

=== Modern secondary sources ===
- Afonasin, Eugene V. (2012). Afonasin, Eugene V.; Dillon, John M.; Finamore, John (eds.). Iamblichus and the Foundations of Late Platonism. Leiden and Boston: Brill. ISBN 978-90-04-23011-8.
- Borlik, Todd A. (2011). Ecocriticism and Early Modern English Literature: Green Pastures. Routledge Studies in Renaissance Literature and Culture. New York City, New York and London, England: Routledge. ISBN 978-0-203-81924-1.
- Bregman, Jay (2002). "Neoplatonism and American Aesthetics". In Alexandrakis, Aphrodite; Moulafakis, Nicholas J. (eds.). Neoplatonism and Western Aesthetics. Studies in Neoplatonism: Ancient and Modern. Vol. 12. Albany, New York: State University of New York Press. ISBN 978-0-7914-5280-6.
- Burkert, Walter (May 1960). "Platon oder Pythagoras?: Zum Ursprung des Wortes 'Philosophie'". Hermes (in German). 88 (2): 159–177. JSTOR 4475110.
- ——— (1972). Lore and Science in Ancient Pythagoreanism. Translated by Minar, Edwin L. Jr. Cambridge, Massachusetts: Harvard University Press. ISBN 978-0-674-53918-1 – via Internet Archive.
- ——— (1985). Greek Religion. Translated by Raffan, John. Cambridge, Massachusetts: Harvard University Press. ISBN 978-0-674-36281-9.
- Celenza, Christopher (2010). "Pythagoras and Pythagoreanism". In Grafton, Anthony; Most, Glenn W.; Settis, Salvatore (eds.). The Classical Tradition. Cambridge, Massachusetts and London, England: The Belknap Press of Harvard University Press. pp. 796–799. ISBN 978-0-674-03572-0.
- Copleston, Frederick (2003) [1946]. "The Pythagorean Society". A History of Philosophy. Vol. 1 Greece and Rome. London, England and New York City, New York: Continuum. ISBN 978-0-8264-6947-2.
- Cornelli, Gabriele; McKirahan, Richard (2013). In Search of Pythagoreanism: Pythagoreanism as an Historiographical Category. Berlin, Germany: Walter de Gruyter. ISBN 978-3-11-030650-7.
- De Vogel, Cornelia J. (1966). Pythagoras and Early Pythagoreanism: An Interpretation of Neglected Evidence on the Philosopher Pythagoras. Assen: Van Gorcum. OCLC 513833.
- Dicks, D. R. (1970). Early Greek Astronomy to Aristotle. Ithaca, New York: Cornell University Press. ISBN 978-0-8014-0561-7.
- Dillon, John; Hershbell, Jackson (1991). Betz, Hans Dieter; O'Neill, Edward N. (eds.). Iamblichus, On the Pythagorean way of life: Text, Translation and Notes. Text and Translations 29: Graeco Romain Religion Series. Vol. 11. Atlanta, Georgia: Scholars Press. ISBN 1-55540-522-3 – via Internet Archive.
- Ferguson, Kitty (2008). The Music of Pythagoras: How an Ancient Brotherhood Cracked the Code of the Universe and Lit the Path from Antiquity to Outer Space. Bloomsbury Publishing. ISBN 978-0-8027-7963-2.
- French, Peter J. (2002) [1972]. John Dee: The World of the Elizabethan Magus. New York City, New York and London, England: Routledge. ISBN 978-0-7448-0079-1.
- Grant, Michael (1989). The Classical Greeks. History of Civilization. New York City, New York: Charles Schribner's Sons. ISBN 978-0-684-19126-3.
- Gregory, Andrew (2015). "The Pythagoreans: number and numerology". In Lawrence, Snezana; McCartney, Mark (eds.). Mathematicians and their Gods: Interactions between mathematics and religious beliefs. Oxford University Press. pp. 21–50. ISBN 978-0-19-100755-2.
- Guthrie, William Keith Chambers (1967) [1962]. A History of Greek Philosophy, Volume 1: The Earlier Presocratics and the Pythagoreans. Cambridge University Press. OCLC 973780248 – via Internet Archive.
- Hare, R. M. (1999) [1982]. "Plato". In Taylor, C. C. W.; Hare, R. M.; Barnes, Jonathan (eds.). Greek Philosophers: Socrates, Plato, and Aristotle. Past Masters. Oxford, England: Oxford University Press. pp. 103–189. ISBN 978-0-19-285422-3.
- Jacoby, Felix; Bollansée, Jan (1999). Schepens, Guido (ed.). Die Fragmente der griechischen Historiker. Vol. 4. Brill. ISBN 978-90-04-11303-9.
- James, Jamie (1993). The Music of the Spheres. New York, NY: Grove Press. ISBN 978-0-8021-1307-8 – via Internet Archive.
- Joost-Gaugier, Christiane L. (2006). Measuring Heaven: Pythagoras and his Influence on Thought and Art in Antiquity and the Middle Ages. Ithaca, New York: Cornell University Press. ISBN 978-0-8014-7409-5.
- Kahn, Charles H. (2001). Pythagoras and the Pythagoreans: A Brief History. Indianapolis, Indiana and Cambridge, England: Hackett Publishing Company. ISBN 978-0-87220-575-8. OCLC 46394974 – via Internet Archive.
- Kenny, Anthony (2004). Ancient Philosophy. A New History of Western Philosophy. Vol. 1. Oxford, England: Oxford University Press. ISBN 978-0-19-875273-8.
- Lloyd, Geoffrey (24 April 2014). "Pythagoras". In Huffman, Carl A. (ed.). A History of Pythagoreanism. Cambridge University Press. pp. 24–45. ISBN 978-1-139-91598-4.
- McKeown, J. C. (2013). A Cabinet of Greek Curiosities: Strange Tales and Surprising Facts from the Cradle of Western Civilization. Oxford, England: Oxford University Press. ISBN 978-0-19-998210-3.
- O'Meara, Dominic J. (1989). Pythagoras Revived. Oxford, England: Oxford University Press. ISBN 978-0-19-823913-0.
- Pomeroy, Sarah B. (2013). Pythagorean Women: The History and Writings. Baltimore, Maryland: The Johns Hopkins University Press. ISBN 978-1-4214-0956-6.
- Riedweg, Christoph (2005) [2002]. Pythagoras: His Life, Teachings, and Influence. Ithaca, New York: Cornell University Press. ISBN 978-0-8014-7452-1.
- Russo, Attilio (2004). "Costantino Lascaris tra fama e oblio nel Cinquecento messinese". Archivio Storico Messinese. LXXXIV–LXXXV: 5–87, especially 51–53. ISSN 0392-0240.
- Sherman, William Howard (1995). John Dee: The Politics of Reading and Writing in the English Renaissance. Amherst, Massachusetts: The University of Massachusetts Press. ISBN 978-1-55849-070-3.
- Taub, Liba (2017). Science Writing in Greco-Roman Antiquity. Cambridge University Press. ISBN 978-0-521-11370-0.
- Whitehead, Afred North (1953) [1926]. Science and the Modern World. Cambridge, England: Cambridge University Press.
- Zhmud, Leonid (2012) [1994]. Pythagoras and the Early Pythagoreans. Translated by Windle, Kevin; Ireland, Rosh. Oxford University Press. ISBN 978-0-19-928931-8.
