= Stormer =

Stormer or Störmer may refer to:

== People ==
- John A. Stormer (1928–2018), American writer
- Carl Størmer (1874–1957), Norwegian physicist and mathematician
- Erling Størmer (born 1937), Norwegian mathematician
- Fredrik Størmer (disambiguation), multiple people
- Horst Ludwig Störmer (born 1949), German physicist
- Leif Størmer (1905–1979), Norwegian paleontologist and geologist
- Mark Stoermer (born 1977), American musician

== Fiction ==
- Stormer, a character on the television series Jem
- Preston Stormer, a character from the LEGO theme and television series, Hero Factory

== Other ==
- Stormer (band), an American hard rock band
- Störmer (crater), a lunar crater
- Stormers (rugby club), a South African rugby team
- Størmer's theorem, in number theory
- Alvis Stormer, a military armored vehicle
- Land Rover Range Stormer, a concept car manufactured by Ford
- The Daily Stormer, an American neo-Nazi website
