= Superpartient ratio =

In mathematics, a superpartient ratio, also called superpartient number or epimeric ratio, is a rational number that is greater than one and is not superparticular. The term has fallen out of use in modern pure mathematics, but continues to be used in music theory and in the historical study of mathematics.

Superpartient ratios were written about by Nicomachus in his treatise Introduction to Arithmetic.

== Overview ==
Mathematically, a superpartient number is a ratio of the form

$$\frac{n + a}{n}\, ,$$

where a is greater than 1 (a > 1) and is also coprime to n. Ratios of the form $\tfrac{n+1}{n}$ are also greater than one and fully reduced, but are called superparticular ratios and are not superpartient.

Examples
| Ratio | $\frac{n + a}{n}$ | Related musical interval | Audio |
|---|---|---|---|
| 5:3 | $\frac{3+2}{3}$ | Major sixth | |
| 7:4 | $\frac{4+3}{4}$ | Harmonic seventh | |
| 8:5 | $\frac{5+3}{5}$ | Minor sixth | |

== Etymology ==
Superpartient is a calque from Greek ἐπιμερής epimeres "containing a whole and a fraction".

== See also ==
- Mathematics of musical scales
