= 1.5 =

1.5 (one and one half, three halves, or sesquialterum) may refer to:

- 1.5 °C, the preferred limit of global warming signed in the Paris Agreement
- 1.5, an album by Big Data
- Superparticular ratio, 3/2 or 1 1/2
- Perfect fifth (3/2), a musical interval
- "1.5" (song), 2018, by 21 Savage
