= Amthor =

Amthor is a surname. Notable people with the surname include:

- Carl Ernst August Amthor (1845–1916), German headmaster, solved the Archimedes's cattle problem
- Christoph Heinrich Amthor (1677–1721), German poet and translator of the Baroque
- Eduard Gottlieb Amthor (1820–1884), German bookseller and school director
- Ehrenfried Amthor (1638–1696), senior administrative officer in the Danish army
- Joachim Ulrich Amthor (1631–1694), Countess-Stolberg Hofrat, Chancellor and Director of the Consistory in Stolberg
- Philipp Amthor (born 1992), German politician (CDU)
- Terry K. Amthor (1958–2021), American game designer
- William Ramier Amthor (1909–1983), founder of Cost Plus World Market. William Amthor's father opened Amthor Imports in San Francisco in the 1920s. William Amthor and Lincoln Bartlett opened a second store in 1958 (in Fisherman's Wharf), named Cost Plus, which later changed to Cost Plus World Market (today simply World Market).
