= Abrahão de Moraes =

Brazilian astronomer and mathematician

Abrahão De Moraes (1916–1970) was a Brazilian astronomer and mathematician. He taught at the Polytechnic School of the University of São Paulo and also served as director of the Instituto Astronômico e Geofísico.

The Abrahão de Moraes Observatory (OAM) is named after him. Founded in 1972, it is situated in the municipality of Valinhos, 90 km from São Paulo. The crater De Moraes on the Moon is named after him. He is regarded as one of his country's greatest astronomers.

== Sources ==
- Observatório Abrahão de Moraes
