= Nicomachus =

1st-century AD Greek philosopher, mathematician and music theorist

Nicomachus of Gerasa
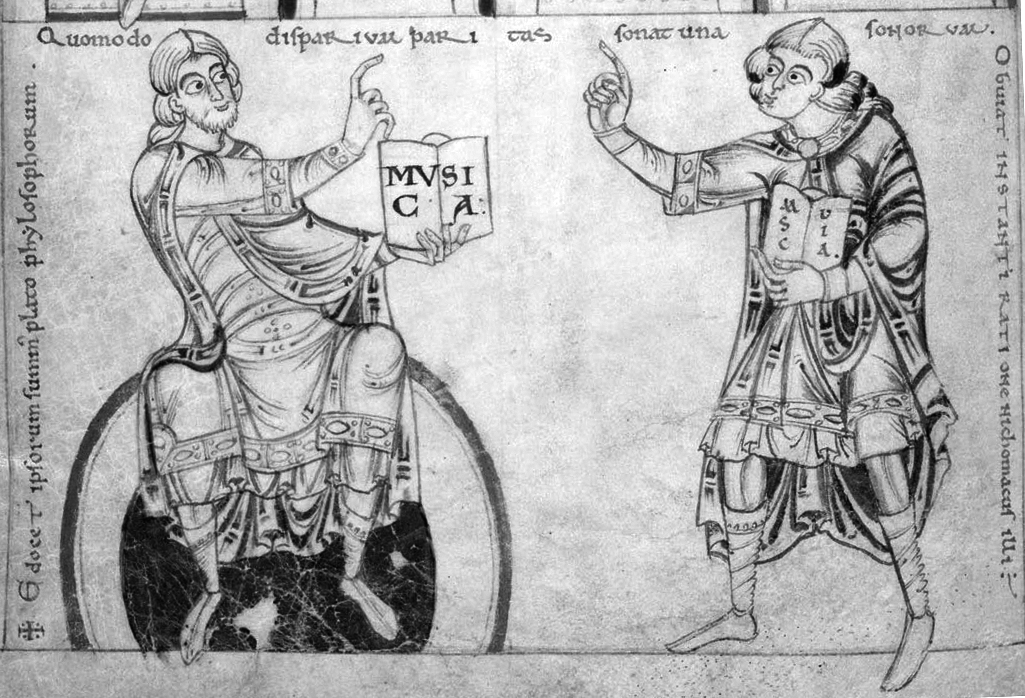
- Plato (left) and Nicomachus (right), as inventors of music, from a 12th-century manuscript
- Born: c. 60; Gerasa, Roman Syria
- Died: c. 120

Philosophical work
- Era: Ancient philosophy
- Region: Western philosophy
- School: Neopythagoreanism
- Main interests: Metaphysics, arithmetic, music theory
- Notable works: Introduction to Arithmetic; Manual of Harmonics
- Notable ideas: Multiplication tables

Nicomachus of Gerasa (Ancient Greek: Νικόμαχος ὁ Γερασηνός; c. 60 – c. 120 AD) was a Greek Neopythagorean philosopher from Gerasa (now Jerash, Jordan).

Like many Pythagoreans, Nicomachus wrote about the mystical properties of numbers, best known for his works Introduction to Arithmetic and Manual of Harmonics, which are an important resource on Ancient Greek mathematics and Ancient Greek music in the Roman period. Nicomachus' work on arithmetic became a standard text for Neoplatonic education in Late antiquity, with philosophers such as Iamblichus and John Philoponus writing commentaries on it. A Latin paraphrase by Boethius of Nicomachus's works on arithmetic and music became standard textbooks in medieval education.

== Life ==
Little is known about the life of Nicomachus except that he was a Pythagorean who came from Gerasa. His Manual of Harmonics was addressed to a lady of noble birth, at whose request Nicomachus wrote the book, which suggests that he was a respected scholar of some status. He mentions his intent to write a more advanced work, and how the journeys he frequently undertakes leave him short of time.The approximate dates in which he lived (c. 100 AD) can only be estimated based on which other authors he refers to in his work, as well as which later mathematicians who refer to him. He mentions Thrasyllus in his Manual of Harmonics, and his Introduction to Arithmetic was apparently translated into Latin in the mid 2nd century by Apuleius,while he makes no mention at all of either Theon of Smyrna's work on arithmetic or Ptolemy's work on music, implying that they were either later contemporaries or lived in the time after he did.

== Philosophy ==
Historians consider Nicomachus a Neopythagorean based on his tendency to view numbers as having mystical properties rather than their mathematical properties, citing an extensive amount of Pythagorean literature in his work, including works by Philolaus, Archytas, and Androcydes. He writes extensively on numbers, especially on the significance of prime numbers and perfect numbers and argues that arithmetic is ontologically prior to the other mathematical sciences (music, geometry, and astronomy), and is their cause. Nicomachus distinguishes between the wholly conceptual immaterial number, which he regards as the 'divine number', and the numbers which measure material things, the 'scientific' number. Nicomachus provided one of the earliest Greco-Roman multiplication tables; the oldest extant Greek multiplication table is found on a wax tablet dated to the 1st century AD (now found in the British Museum).

=== Metaphysics ===
Although Nicomachus is considered a Pythagorean, John M. Dillon says that Nicomachus's philosophy "fits comfortably within the spectrum of contemporary Platonism." In his work on arithmetic, Nicomachus quotes from Plato's Timaeus to make a distinction between the intelligible world of Forms and the sensible world, however, he also makes more Pythagorean distinctions, such as between Odd and even numbers. Unlike many other Neopythagoreans, such as Moderatus of Gades, Nicomachus makes no attempt to distinguish between the Demiurge, who acts on the material world, and The One which serves as the supreme first principle. For Nicomachus, God as the supreme first principle is both the demiurge and the Intellect (nous), which Nicomachus also equates to being the monad, the potentiality from which all actualities are created.

== Works ==
Two of Nicomachus' works, the Introduction to Arithmetic and the Manual of Harmonics are extant in a complete form, and two others, a work on Theology of Arithmetic and a Life of Pythagoras survive in fragments, epitomes, and summaries by later authors. The Theology of Arithmetic (Ancient Greek: Θεολογούμενα ἀριθμητικῆς), on the Pythagorean mystical properties of numbers in two books is mentioned by Photius. There is an extant work sometimes attributed to Iamblichus under this title written two centuries later which contains a great deal of material thought to have been copied or paraphrased from Nicomachus' work. Nicomachus's Life of Pythagoras was one of the main sources used by Porphyry and Iamblichus, for their (extant) Lives of Pythagoras. An Introduction to Geometry, referred to by Nicomachus himself in the Introduction to Arithmetic, has not survived. Among his known lost work is another larger work on music, promised by Nicomachus himself, and apparently referred to by Eutocius in his comment on the sphere and cylinder of Archimedes.

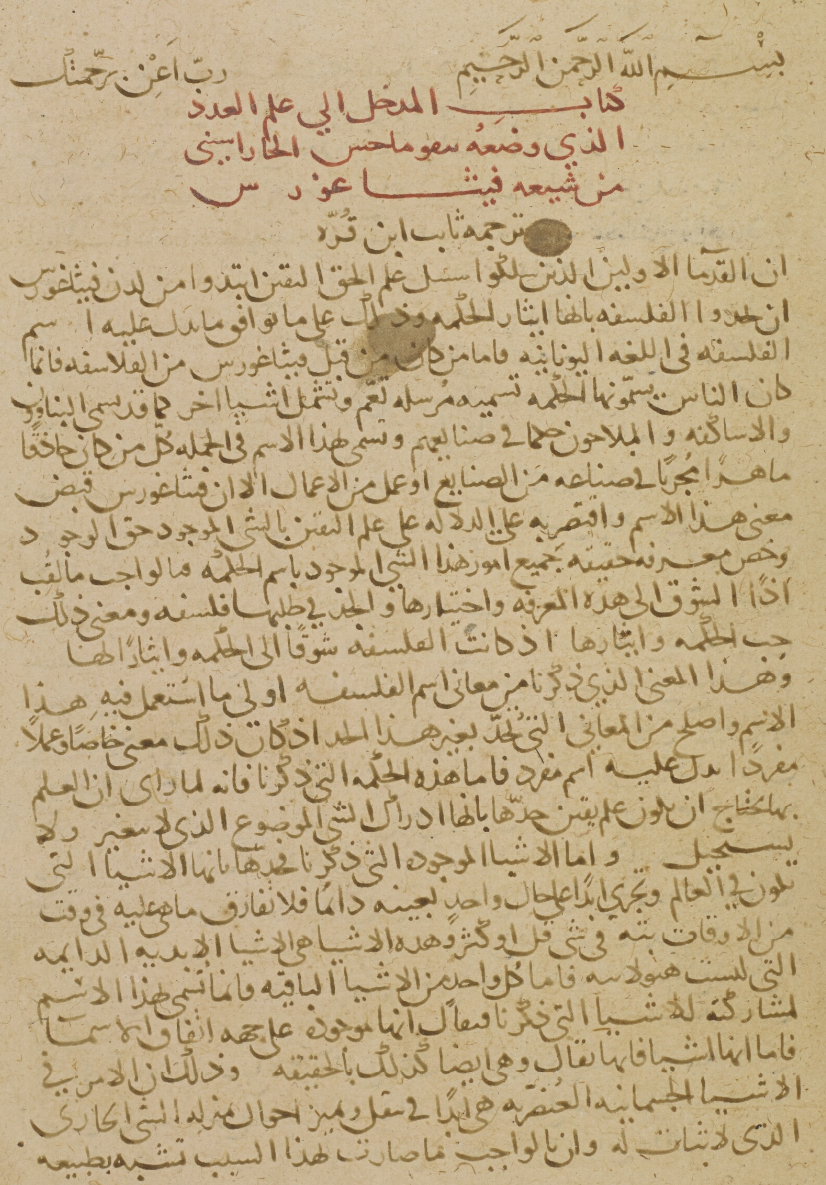
Arabic manuscript of Introduction to Arithmetic, translated by Thābit ibn Qurra (d. 901). British Library: Oriental Manuscripts, Add MS 7473.

=== Introduction to Arithmetic ===
Introduction to Arithmetic (Ancient Greek: Ἀριθμητικὴ εἰσαγωγή, Arithmetike eisagoge) is the only extant work on mathematics by Nicomachus. The work contains both philosophical prose and basic mathematical ideas. Nicomachus refers to Plato quite often, and writes that philosophy can only be possible if one knows enough about mathematics. Nicomachus also describes how natural numbers and basic mathematical ideas are eternal and unchanging, and in an abstract realm. The work consists of two books, twenty-three and twenty-nine chapters, respectively.

Nicomachus's presentation is much less rigorous than Euclid centuries earlier. Propositions are typically stated and illustrated with one example, but not proven through inference. In some instances this results in patently false assertions. For example, he states that from (a−b) ∶ (b−c) ∷ c ∶ a it can be concluded that ab=2bc, only because this is true for a=6, b=5 and c=3.

Boethius' De institutione arithmetica is in large part a Latin translation of this work.

=== Manual of Harmonics ===
Manuale Harmonicum (Ἐγχειρίδιον ἁρμονικῆς, Encheiridion Harmonikes) is the first important music theory treatise since the time of Aristoxenus and Euclid. It provides the earliest surviving record of the legend of Pythagoras's epiphany outside of a smithy that pitch is determined by numeric ratios. Nicomachus also gives the first in-depth account of the relationship between music and the ordering of the universe via the "music of the spheres." Nicomachus's discussion of the governance of the ear and voice in understanding music unites Aristoxenian and Pythagorean concerns, normally regarded as antitheses. In the midst of theoretical discussions, Nicomachus also describes the instruments of his time, also providing a valuable resource. In addition to the Manual, ten extracts survive from what appear to have originally been a more substantial work on music.

== Legacy ==
Nicomachus's theorem states that a square whose side length is a triangular number can be partitioned into squares and half-squares whose areas add to cubes

=== Late antiquity ===
The Introduction to Arithmetic of Nicomachus was a standard textbook in Neoplatonic schools, and commentaries on it were written by Iamblichus (3rd century) and John Philoponus (6th century).

The Arithmetic (in Latin: De Institutione Arithmetica) of Boethius was a Latin paraphrase and a partial translation of the Introduction to Arithmetic. The Manual of Harmonics also became the basis of the Boethius' Latin treatise titled De institutione musica.

=== Medieval European philosophy ===
The work of Boethius on arithmetic and music was a core part of the Quadrivium liberal arts and had a great diffusion during the Middle Ages.

=== Nicomachus's theorem ===
Alternative proof using squares

At the end of Chapter 20 of his Introduction to Arithmetic, Nicomachus points out that if one writes a list of the odd numbers, the first is the cube of 1, the sum of the next two is the cube of 2, the sum of the next three is the cube of 3, and so on. He does not go further than this, but from this it follows that the sum of the first n cubes equals the sum of the first $n(n+1)/2$ odd numbers, that is, the odd numbers from 1 to $n(n+1)-1$. The average of these numbers is obviously $n(n+1)/2$, and there are $n(n+1)/2$ of them, so their sum is $\bigl(n(n+1)/2\bigr)^2.$ Many early mathematicians have studied and provided proofs of Nicomachus's theorem.

== See also ==
- Superparticular number
- Superpartient number

== Bibliography ==
=== Editions and translations ===
==== Introduction to Arithmetic ====
- Nicomachus, of Gerasa; Hoche, Richard Gottfried (1866). Nicomachi Geraseni Pythagorei Introductionis arithmeticae libri II (in Ancient Greek). Lipsiae : in aedibvs B.G. Teubneri.
- D'Ooge, Martin Luther; Robbins, Frank Egleston; Karpinski, Louis Charles (1926). Nicomachus' Introduction to Arithmetic. Macmillan.

==== Manual of Harmonics ====
- Jan, Karl von; Nicomachus (1895). Musici scriptores graeci. Aristoteles, Euclides, Nicomachus, Bacchius, Gaudentius, Alypius et melodiarum veterum quidquid exstat (in Ancient Greek). Lipsiae, in aedibus B. G. Teubneri. pp. 209–282.
- Andrew Barker, editor, Greek Musical Writings vol 2: Harmonic and Acoustic Theory (Cambridge: Cambridge University Press, 1989), pp. 245–69.
- Sofia Di Mambro (ed.), Nicomaco di Gerasa. Manuale di armonica, edizione critica, traduzione e commento (Mathematica graeca antiqua 5), Roma, F. Serra 2025.

=== Primary sources ===
- Iamblichus (January 1989). Gillian Clark (ed.). On the Pythagorean Life. Liverpool University Press. ISBN 9780853233268.
- Photius, Bibliotheca
- Anonymous, Theology of Arithmetic
- Boethius (1488). De institutione arithmetica (in Latin). Erhard Ratdolt. p. 110 – via Internet Archive.

=== Secondary sources ===
- Dillon, John M. (1996). "Nicomachus of Gerasa". The Middle Platonists, 80 B.C. to A.D. 220. Cornell University Press. pp. 352–361. ISBN 978-0-8014-8316-5.
- Midonick, Henrietta O. (1965). The treasury of mathematics: a collection of source material in mathematics edited and presented with introductory biographical and historical sketches. Philosophical Library. pp. 15–16.
- Schueller, Herbert M. (1988). The Idea of Music An Introduction to Musical Aesthetics in Antiquity and the Middle Ages. Medieval Institute Publications, Western Michigan University. p. 138.
- Snider, Denton J. (1909). Cosmos and Diacosmos The Processes of Nature Psychologically Treated. Sigma publishing Company. p. 148.
