= Olivier (crater) =

Crater on the Moon

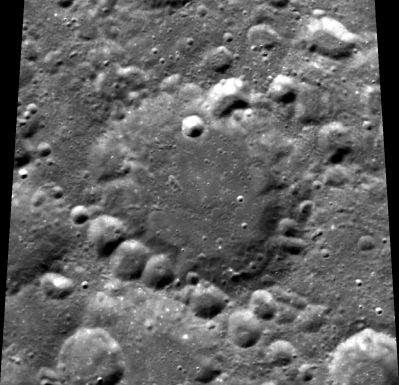
- Clementine mosaic
- Coordinates: 59.1°N 138.5°E
- Diameter: 69 km
- Depth: Unknown
- Colongitude: 224° at sunrise
- Eponym: Charles P. Olivier

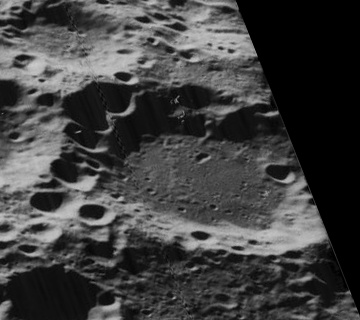
Oblique Lunar Orbiter 5 image

Olivier is an old, eroded crater that is located in the northern hemisphere on the far side of the Moon. It lies in a region of dense cratering on all sides. To the east-southeast is a younger but comparably sized crater named Störmer. Southwest of Olivier is the crater Volterra.

The southern rim of Olivier is covered by an unusual formation of small craters that lie adjacent to each other and have almost completely obliterated the rim. These form a line from the southwest rim to the east-southeast. Several other craters lie across the rim of Olivier, most notably a crater cutting across the northern rim and several smaller craters in the eastern rim. The remainder of the rim is worn and eroded, so that the features have become rounded and somewhat irregular.

In comparison to the rim, the interior floor is nearly flat and smooth. The most notable impact is a small craterlet near the northern rim. There are a few tiny craterlets scattered about, but nothing of significance. The crater lacks a central peak, and the only irregularities lie along the edge of the inner wall.

The crater is named after American astronomer Charles Pollard Olivier.

== Satellite craters ==
By convention these features are identified on lunar maps by placing the letter on the side of the crater midpoint that is closest to Olivier.

Olivier	Latitude	Longitude	Diameter
N	56.7° N	137.1° E	63 km
Y	61.9° N	136.5° E	47 km
