= Pieter Johannes van Rhijn =

Dutch astronomer (1886–1960)

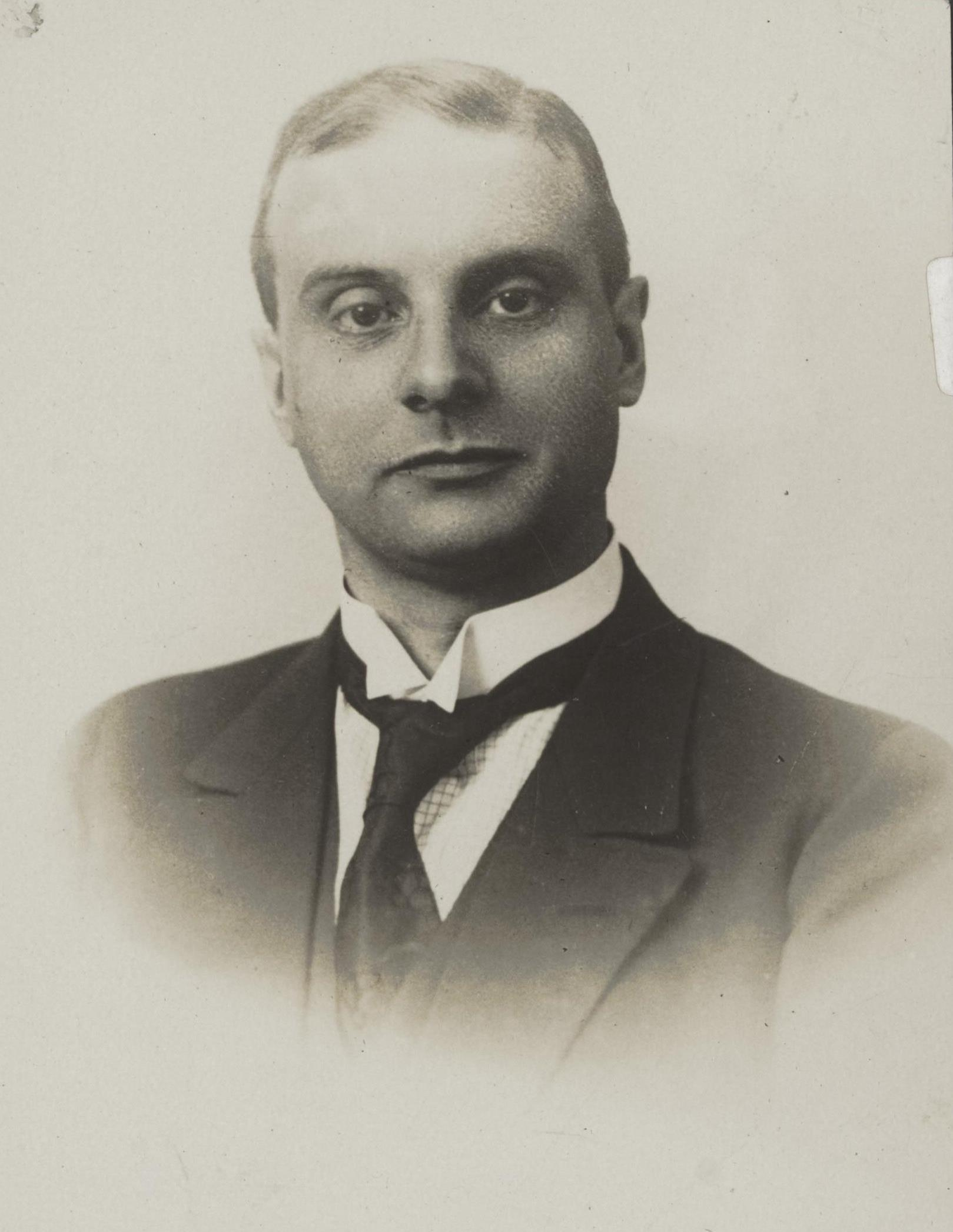
- Born: 24 March 1886
- Died: 9 May 1960; Groningen
- Alma mater: University of Groningen
- Occupation: Astronomer, university teacher
- Employer: University of Groningen

Pieter Johannes van Rhijn (24 March 1886 – 9 May 1960) was a Dutch astronomer. Born in Gouda, he studied at Groningen. He served as director at the Sterrenkundig Laboratorium (Kapteyn Astronomical Institute) in Groningen.

He died in Groningen. The crater van Rhijn on the Moon is named after him, as is asteroid 2203 van Rhijn.

== Sources ==
- Stamboom geslacht Van Rhijn (Dutch language source)
- Biografie van Rhijn, Pieter Johannes van (Dutch language source)
