= Charles Pollard Olivier =

American astronomer

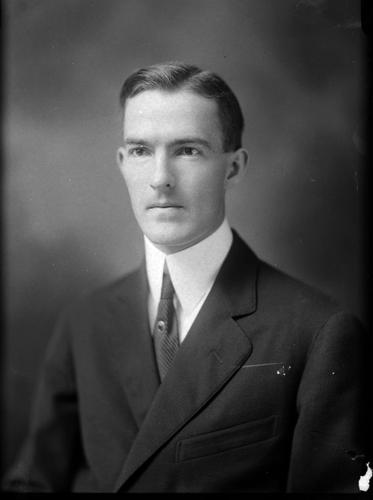
- Olivier, circa 1930
- Born: April 10, 1884; Charlottesville, Virginia
- Died: August 14, 1975 (aged 91); Bryn Mawr, Pennsylvania
- Education: Ph.D.
- Alma mater: University of Virginia
- Known for: Founder of the American Meteor Society
- Spouse(s): Mary Frances Pender (1919); Ninuzza Seymour (1936)
- Children: Alice Dorsey; Elise Pender
- Parent(s): George Wythe Olivier; Katharine Pollard

Charles Pollard Olivier (April 10, 1884 – August 14, 1975) was an American astronomer, notable for his contributions to the study of meteors, double stars and variable stars.

== Biography ==
Charles grew up in Charlottesville, Virginia, and he lived close to the University of Virginia. In 1901 he became an assistant at the nearby Leander McCormick Observatory, and in 1905 he was Vanderbilt fellow at the observatory. He completed his Ph.D. in astronomy by 1911, with a dissertation disproving the existence of stationary meteor radiants.

In 1911 Olivier founded the American Meteor Society to perform visual observations of random meteors as well as meteor showers. It was created as an offshoot from the American Astronomical Society. Along with the British astronomer William F. Denning, Olivier pioneered the scientific visual study of meteors.

From 1912 until 1914 he was professor of astronomy at the Agnes Scott College in Decatur, Georgia. He also served as a summer volunteer at the Yerkes Observatory. He returned to the University of Virginia in 1914 as an assistant professor, and was hired onto the McCormick Observatory staff to work on parallax measurements. In 1918 he left to serve in the world war.

Following the war he became director of the Flower Observatory at the University of Pennsylvania in 1928, resigning his position as a professor at Virginia. By 1945 he was Chairman of the University of Pennsylvania department of astronomy. During the 1940s he encouraged the university to sell off the land to pay for a new observatory. This was finally completed in 1956 and was named the Flower and Cook Observatory.

== Bibliography ==
- Charles P. Olivier, "Meteors", Baltimore, The Williams & Wilkins Co., 1925.
- Charles P. Olivier, "Comets", Baltimore, The Williams & Wilkins Co., 1930.

== Awards and honors ==
- Olivier was elected to the American Philosophical Society in 1932.
- The AMS gives a Dr. Charles P. Olivier Award each year to an amateur astronomer in the field of meteor science.
- The crater Olivier on the Moon is named after him.
