= Fredrik Størmer =

Fredrik Størmer may refer to:

- Fredrik Carl Mülertz Størmer, Norwegian mathematician and geophysicist
- Fredrik Carl Størmer, Norwegian jazz artiste
- Henrik Christian Fredrik Størmer, Norwegian engineer
