= Van Rhijn (crater) =

Crater on the Moon

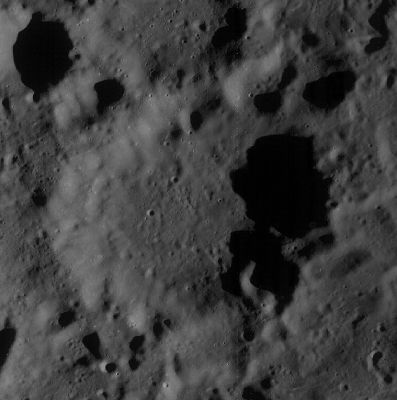
- LRO image
- Coordinates: 52.6°N 146.4°E
- Diameter: 46 km
- Depth: Unknown
- Colongitude: 214° at sunrise
- Eponym: Pieter J. van Rhijn

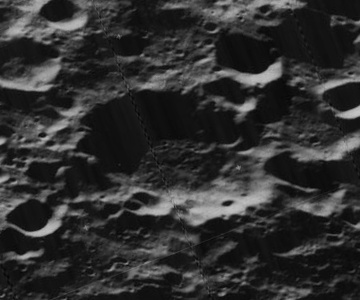
Oblique Lunar Orbiter 5 image

van Rhijn is an old lunar impact crater that is located on the far side of the Moon, in the northern hemisphere. It lies due south of the larger crater Störmer, and to the north-northeast of De Moraes.

The outer rim of this crater has been deeply worn and eroded by impacts, with smaller craters intruding into the northeast, northwest, and southeastern parts of the rim. The remaining features of the rim have been softened and rounded, leaving the crater little more than a depression in the surface. The interior floor is relatively flat and featureless, with no significant craters.

== Satellite craters ==
By convention these features are identified on lunar maps by placing the letter on the side of the crater midpoint that is closest to van Rhijn.

van Rhijn	Latitude	Longitude	Diameter
T	52.2° N	140.0° E	35 km
