= De Moraes (crater) =

Lunar impact crater

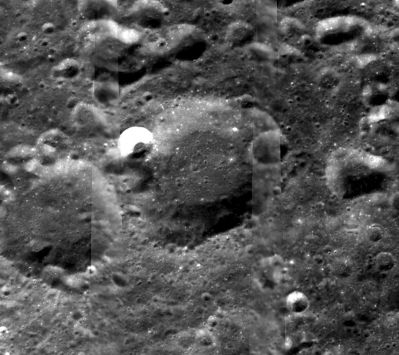
- Clementine mosaic
- Coordinates: 49.5°N 143.2°E
- Diameter: 54.41 km (33.81 mi)
- Depth: Unknown
- Colongitude: 218° at sunrise
- Eponym: Abrahão De Moraes

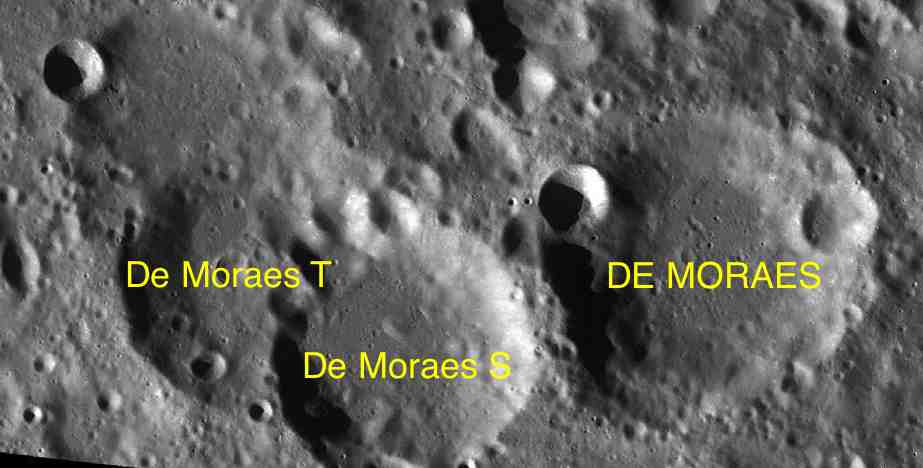
Satellite features

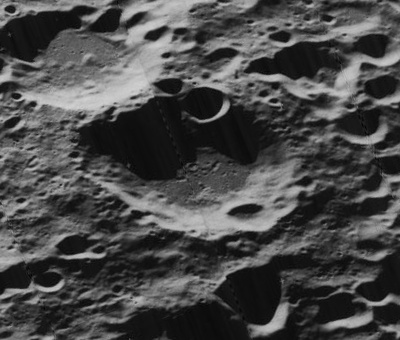
Oblique Lunar Orbiter 5 image

De Moraes is a lunar impact crater that is located in the northern part of the Moon's far side. It lies to the northeast of the larger crater Bridgman, and southwest of van Rhijn. To the southeast is the heavily degraded Campbell formation.

This is a worn crater feature with features that have been softened and rounded from a long history of minor impacts. Small but notable craters overlay the rim and inner walls on the northeast and northwest sides, and there is a slanting gouge in the eastern rim. The interior floor is nearly featureless, being marked only by a few tiny craterlets. Nearly attached to the west-southwest outer rim is the satellite feature De Moreas T.

This formation is named after the Brazilian astronomer Abrahão De Moraes (1916-1970). Its designation was officially adopted by the International Astronomical Union in 1979.

== Satellite craters ==
By convention these features are identified on lunar maps by placing the letter on the side of the crater midpoint that is closest to De Moraes.

De Moraes	Latitude	Longitude	Diameter
S	48.9° N	140.7° E	45 km
T	49.3° N	139.5° E	46 km
