= Music and mathematics =

Relationships between music and mathematics

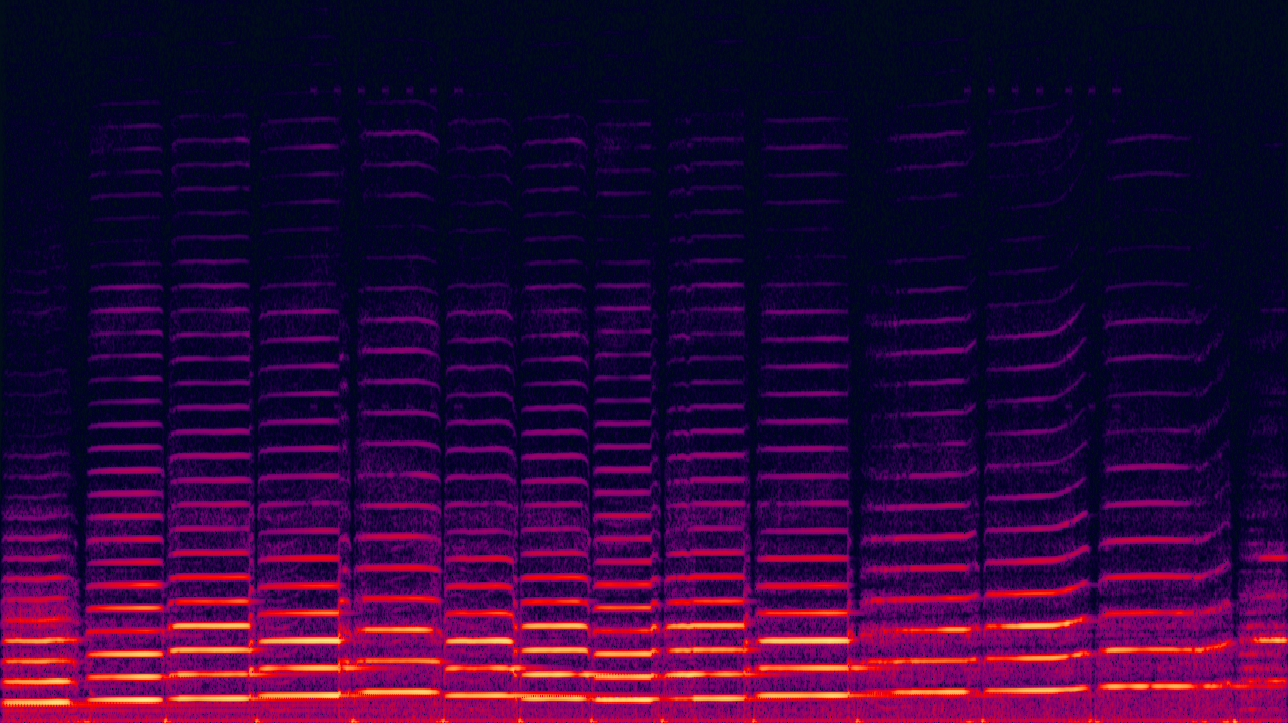
A spectrogram of a violin waveform, with linear frequency on the vertical axis and time on the horizontal axis. The bright lines show how the spectral components change over time. The intensity colouring is logarithmic (black is −120 dBFS).

Music theory analyzes the pitch, timing, and structure of music. It uses mathematics to study elements of music such as tempo, chord progression, form, and meter. The attempt to structure and communicate new ways of composing and hearing music has led to musical applications of set theory, abstract algebra and number theory.

While music theory has no axiomatic foundation in modern mathematics, the basis of musical sound can be described mathematically (using acoustics) and exhibits "a remarkable array of number properties".

== History ==
Though ancient Chinese, Indians, Egyptians and Mesopotamians are known to have studied the mathematical principles of sound, the Pythagoreans (in particular Philolaus and Archytas) of ancient Greece were the first researchers known to have investigated the expression of musical scales in terms of numerical ratios, particularly the ratios of small integers. Their central doctrine was that "all nature consists of harmony arising out of numbers".

From the time of Plato, harmony was considered a fundamental branch of physics, now known as musical acoustics. Early Indian and Chinese theorists show similar approaches: all sought to show that the mathematical laws of harmonics and rhythms were fundamental not only to our understanding of the world but to human well-being. Confucius, like Pythagoras, regarded the small numbers 1, 2, 3, and 4 as the source of all perfection.

== Time, rhythm, and meter ==
Without the boundaries of rhythmic structure – a fundamental equal and regular arrangement of pulse repetition, accent, phrase and duration – music would not be possible. Modern musical use of terms like meter and measure also reflects the historical importance of music, along with astronomy, in the development of counting, arithmetic and the exact measurement of time and periodicity that is fundamental to physics.

The elements of musical form often build strict proportions or hypermetric structures (powers of the numbers 2 and 3).

== Musical form ==
Musical form is the plan by which a short piece of music is extended. The term "plan" is also used in architecture, to which musical form is often compared. Like the architect, the composer must take into account the function for which the work is intended and the means available, practicing economy and making use of repetition and order. The common types of form known as binary and ternary ("twofold" and "threefold") once again demonstrate the importance of small integral values to the intelligibility and appeal of music.

== Frequency and harmony ==
Chladni figures produced by sound vibrations in fine powder on a square plate. (Ernst Chladni, Acoustics, 1802)

A musical scale is a discrete set of pitches used in making or describing music. The most important scale in the Western tradition is the diatonic scale but many others have been used and proposed in various historical eras and parts of the world. Each pitch corresponds to a particular frequency, expressed in hertz (Hz), sometimes referred to as cycles per second (c.p.s.). A scale has an interval of repetition, normally the octave. The octave of any pitch refers to a frequency exactly twice that of the given pitch.

Succeeding superoctaves are pitches found at frequencies four, eight, sixteen times, and so on, of the fundamental frequency. Pitches at frequencies of half, a quarter, an eighth and so on of the fundamental are called suboctaves. There is no case in musical harmony where, if a given pitch be considered accordant, that its octaves are considered otherwise. Therefore, any note and its octaves will generally be found similarly named in musical systems (e.g. all will be called doh or A or Sa, as the case may be).

When expressed as a frequency bandwidth an octave A_{2}–A_{3} spans from 110 Hz to 220 Hz (span=110 Hz). The next octave will span from 220 Hz to 440 Hz (span=220 Hz). The third octave spans from 440 Hz to 880 Hz (span=440 Hz) and so on. Each successive octave spans twice the frequency range of the previous octave.

The exponential nature of octaves when measured on a linear frequency scale.

This diagram presents octaves as they appear in the sense of musical intervals, equally spaced.

Because we are often interested in the relations or ratios between the pitches (known as intervals) rather than the precise pitches themselves in describing a scale, it is usual to refer to all the scale pitches in terms of their ratio from a particular pitch, which is given the value of one (often written 1/1), generally a note which functions as the tonic of the scale. For interval size comparison, cents are often used.

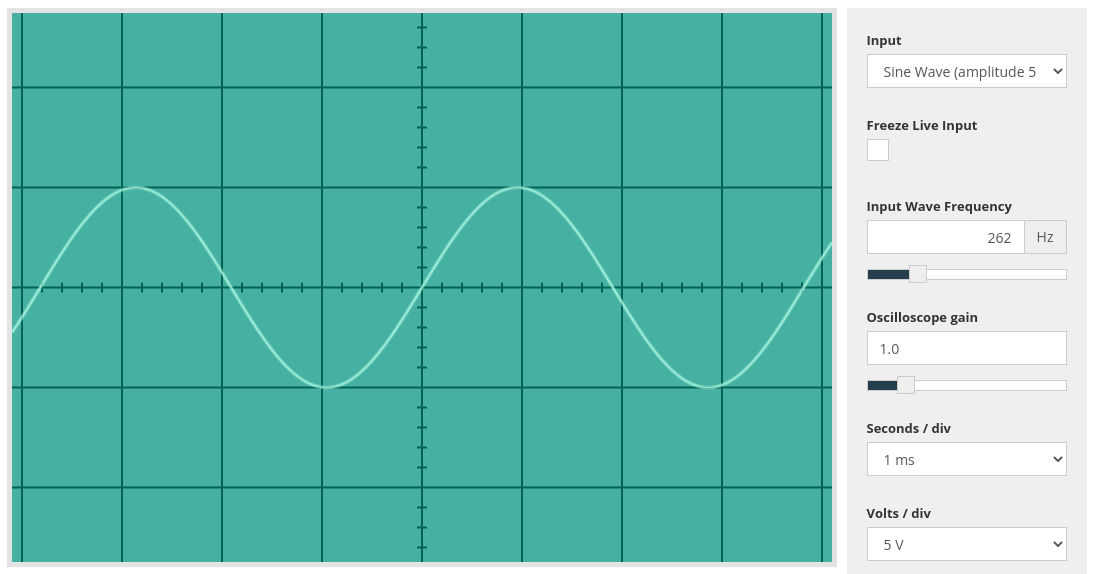
Oscillogram of middle C (262 Hz). (Scale: 1 square is equal to 1 millisecond)

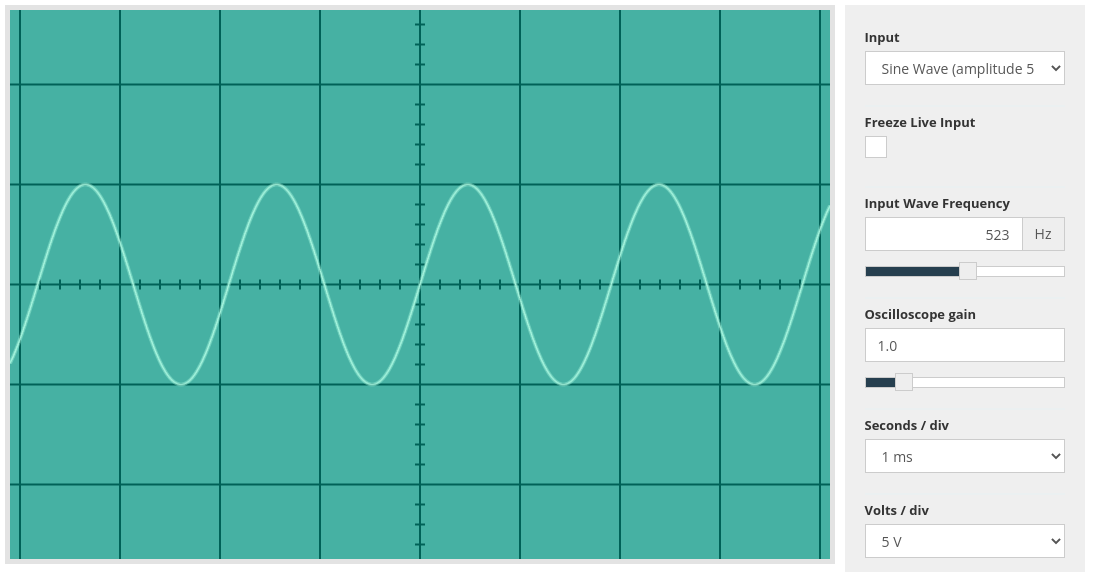
C5, an octave above middle C. The frequency is twice that of middle C (523 Hz).

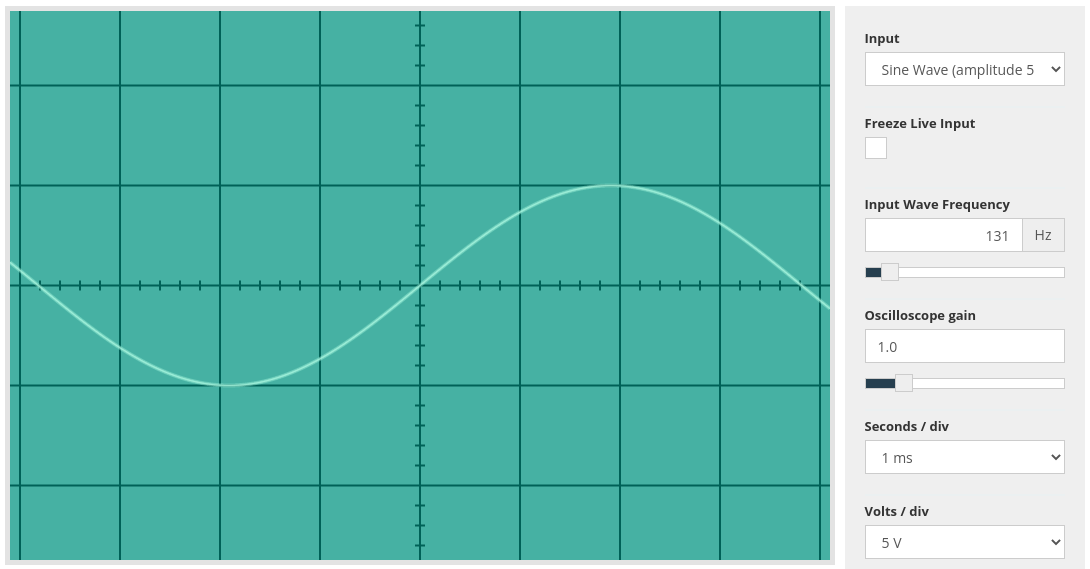
C3, an octave below middle C. The frequency is half that of middle C (131 Hz).

Common term	Example name	Hz	Multiple of fundamental	Ratio of within octave	Cents within octave
Fundamental	A_{2}	110	$1x$	$1/1 = 1x$	0
Octave	A_{3}	220	$2x$	$2/1 = 2x$	1200
Octave	A_{3}	220	$2x$	$2/2 = 1x$	0
Perfect fifth	E_{4}	330	$3x$	$3/2 = 1.5x$	702
Octave	A_{4}	440	$4x$	$4/2 = 2x$	1200
Octave	A_{4}	440	$4x$	$4/4 = 1x$	0
Major third	C♯_{5}	550	$5x$	$5/4 = 1.25x$	386
Perfect fifth	E_{5}	660	$6x$	$6/4 = 1.5x$	702
Harmonic seventh	G_{5}	770	$7x$	$7/4 = 1.75x$	969
Octave	A_{5}	880	$8x$	$8/4 = 2x$	1200
Octave	A_{5}	880	$8x$	$8/8 = 1x$	0

== Tuning systems ==
There are two main families of tuning systems: equal temperament and just tuning. Equal temperament scales are built by dividing an octave into intervals which are equal on a logarithmic scale, which results in perfectly evenly divided scales, but with ratios of frequencies which are irrational numbers. Just scales are built by multiplying frequencies by rational numbers, which results in simple ratios between frequencies, but with scale divisions that are uneven.

One major difference between equal temperament tunings and just tunings is differences in acoustical beat when two notes are sounded together, which affects the subjective experience of consonance and dissonance. Both of these systems, and the vast majority of music in general, have scales that repeat on the interval of every octave, which is defined as frequency ratio of 2:1. In other words, every time the frequency is doubled, the given scale repeats.

Below are Ogg Vorbis files demonstrating the difference between just intonation and equal temperament. You might need to play the samples several times before you can detect the difference.

- Two sine waves played consecutively – this sample has half-step at 550 Hz (C♯ in the just intonation scale), followed by a half-step at 554.37 Hz (C♯ in the equal temperament scale).
- Same two notes, set against an A440 pedal – this sample consists of a "dyad". The lower note is a constant A (440 Hz in either scale), the upper note is a C♯ in the equal-tempered scale for the first 1", and a C♯ in the just intonation scale for the last 1". Phase differences make it easier to detect the transition than in the previous sample.

=== Just tunings ===
The first 16 harmonics, their names and frequencies, showing the exponential nature of the octave and the simple fractional nature of non-octave harmonics.

The first 16 harmonics, with frequencies and log frequencies.

5-limit tuning, the most common form of just intonation, is a system of tuning using tones that are regular number harmonics of a single fundamental frequency. This was one of the scales Johannes Kepler presented in his Harmonices Mundi (1619) in connection with planetary motion. The same scale was given in transposed form by Scottish mathematician and musical theorist, Alexander Malcolm, in 1721 in his 'Treatise of Musick: Speculative, Practical and Historical', and by theorist Jose Wuerschmidt in the 20th century. A form of it is used in the music of northern India.

American composer Terry Riley also made use of the inverted form of it in his "Harp of New Albion". Just intonation gives superior results when there is little or no chord progression: voices and other instruments gravitate to just intonation whenever possible. However, it gives two different whole tone intervals (9:8 and 10:9) because a fixed tuned instrument, such as a piano, cannot change key. To calculate the frequency of a note in a scale given in terms of ratios, the frequency ratio is multiplied by the tonic frequency. For instance, with a tonic of A4 (A natural above middle C), the frequency is 440 Hz, and a justly tuned fifth above it (E5) is simply 440×(3:2) = 660 Hz.

Semitone	Ratio	Interval	Natural	Half Step
0	1:1	unison	480	0
1	16:15	semitone	512	16:15
2	9:8	major second	540	135:128
3	6:5	minor third	576	16:15
4	5:4	major third	600	25:24
5	4:3	perfect fourth	640	16:15
6	45:32	diatonic tritone	675	135:128
7	3:2	perfect fifth	720	16:15
8	8:5	minor sixth	768	16:15
9	5:3	major sixth	800	25:24
10	9:5	minor seventh	864	27:25
11	15:8	major seventh	900	25:24
12	2:1	octave	960	16:15

Pythagorean tuning is tuning based only on the perfect consonances, the (perfect) octave, perfect fifth, and perfect fourth. Thus the major third is considered not a third but a ditone, literally "two tones", and is (9:8)^{2} = 81:64, rather than the independent and harmonic just 5:4 = 80:64 directly below. A whole tone is a secondary interval, being derived from two perfect fifths minus an octave, (3:2)^{2}/2 = 9:8.

The just major third, 5:4 and minor third, 6:5, are a syntonic comma, 81:80, apart from their Pythagorean equivalents 81:64 and 32:27 respectively. According to Carl Dahlhaus (1990, p. 187), "the dependent third conforms to the Pythagorean, the independent third to the harmonic tuning of intervals."

Western common practice music usually cannot be played in just intonation but requires a systematically tempered scale. The tempering can involve either the irregularities of well temperament or be constructed as a regular temperament, either some form of equal temperament or some other regular meantone, but in all cases will involve the fundamental features of meantone temperament. For example, the root of chord ii, if tuned to a fifth above the dominant, would be a major whole tone (9:8) above the tonic. If tuned a just minor third (6:5) below a just subdominant degree of 4:3, however, the interval from the tonic would equal a minor whole tone (10:9). Meantone temperament reduces the difference between 9:8 and 10:9. Their ratio, (9:8)/(10:9) = 81:80, is treated as a unison. The interval 81:80, called the syntonic comma or comma of Didymus, is the key comma of meantone temperament.

=== Equal temperament tunings ===
In equal temperament, the octave is divided into equal parts on the logarithmic scale. While it is possible to construct equal temperament scale with any number of notes (for example, the 24-tone Arab tone system), the most common number is 12, which makes up the equal-temperament chromatic scale. In western music, a division into twelve intervals is commonly assumed unless it is specified otherwise.

For the chromatic scale, the octave is divided into twelve equal parts, each semitone (half-step) is an interval of the twelfth root of two so that twelve of these equal half steps add up to exactly an octave. With fretted instruments it is very useful to use equal temperament so that the frets align evenly across the strings. In the European music tradition, equal temperament was used for lute and guitar music far earlier than for other instruments, such as musical keyboards. Because of this historical force, twelve-tone equal temperament is now the dominant intonation system in the Western, and much of the non-Western, world.

Equally tempered scales have been used and instruments built using various other numbers of equal intervals. The 19 equal temperament, first proposed and used by Guillaume Costeley in the 16th century, uses 19 equally spaced tones, offering better major thirds and far better minor thirds than normal 12-semitone equal temperament at the cost of a flatter fifth. The overall effect is one of greater consonance. Twenty-four equal temperament, with twenty-four equally spaced tones, is widespread in the pedagogy and notation of Arabic music. However, in theory and practice, the intonation of Arabic music conforms to rational ratios, as opposed to the irrational ratios of equally tempered systems.

While any analog to the equally tempered quarter tone is entirely absent from Arabic intonation systems, analogs to a three-quarter tone, or neutral second, frequently occur. These neutral seconds, however, vary slightly in their ratios dependent on maqam, as well as geography. Indeed, Arabic music historian Habib Hassan Touma has written that "the breadth of deviation of this musical step is a crucial ingredient in the peculiar flavor of Arabian music. To temper the scale by dividing the octave into twenty-four quarter-tones of equal size would be to surrender one of the most characteristic elements of this musical culture."

53 equal temperament arises from the near equality of 53 perfect fifths with 31 octaves, and was noted by Jing Fang and Nicholas Mercator.

== Connections to mathematics ==
=== Set theory ===
Musical set theory uses the language of mathematical set theory in an elementary way to organize musical objects and describe their relationships. To analyze the structure of a piece of (typically atonal) music using musical set theory, one usually starts with a set of tones, which could form motives or chords. By applying simple operations such as transposition and inversion, one can discover deep structures in the music. Operations such as transposition and inversion are called isometries because they preserve the intervals between tones in a set.

=== Abstract algebra ===
Expanding on the methods of musical set theory, some theorists have used abstract algebra to analyze music. For example, the pitch classes in an equally tempered octave form an abelian group with 12 elements. It is possible to describe just intonation in terms of a free abelian group.

Transformational theory is a branch of music theory developed by David Lewin. The theory allows for great generality because it emphasizes transformations between musical objects, rather than the musical objects themselves.

Theorists have also proposed musical applications of more sophisticated algebraic concepts. The theory of regular temperaments has been extensively developed with a wide range of sophisticated mathematics, for example by associating each regular temperament with a rational point on a Grassmannian.

The chromatic scale has a free and transitive action of the cyclic group $\mathbb{Z}/12\mathbb{Z}$, with the action being defined via transposition of notes. So the chromatic scale can be thought of as a torsor for the group.

=== Numbers and series ===
Some composers have incorporated the golden ratio and Fibonacci numbers into their work.

=== Category theory ===
The mathematician and musicologist Guerino Mazzola has used category theory (topos theory) for a basis of music theory, which includes using topology as a basis for a theory of rhythm and motives, and differential geometry as a basis for a theory of musical phrasing, tempo, and intonation.

== Musicians who were or are also notable mathematicians ==
- Albert Einstein – Accomplished pianist and violinist.
- Art Garfunkel (Simon & Garfunkel) – Masters in Mathematics Education, Columbia University
- Brian Cox – Professor of particle physics in the School of Physics and Astronomy at the University of Manchester.
- Brian May (Queen) – BSc (Hons) in Mathematics and Physics, PhD in Astrophysics, both from Imperial College London.
- Brian Wecht (Ninja Sex Party) – PhD in particle physics, University of California, San Diego
- Dan Snaith – PhD Mathematics, Imperial College London
- Delia Derbyshire – BA in mathematics and music from Cambridge.
- Donald Knuth – Knuth is an organist and a composer. In 2016 he completed a musical piece for organ titled "Fantasia Apocalyptica". It was premièred in Sweden on January 10, 2018
- Ethan Port (Savage Republic) – PhD Mathematics, University of Southern California
- Gregg Turner (Angry Samoans) – PhD Mathematics, Claremont Graduate University
- Jerome Hines – Five articles published in Mathematics Magazine 1951–1956.
- Jonny Buckland (Coldplay) – Studied astronomy and mathematics at University College London.
- Kit Armstrong – Degree in music and MSc in mathematics.
- Manjul Bhargava – Plays the tabla, won the Fields Medal in 2014.
- Phil Alvin (The Blasters) – Mathematics, University of California, Los Angeles
- Philip Glass – Studied mathematics and philosophy at the University of Chicago.
- Robert Schneider (The Apples in Stereo) – PhD Mathematics, Emory University
- Tom Lehrer – BA mathematics from Harvard University.
- William Herschel – Astronomer and played the oboe, violin, harpsichord and organ. He composed 24 symphonies and many concertos, as well as some church music.

== See also ==
- Computational musicology
- Equal temperament
- Euclidean rhythms (traditional musical rhythms that are generated by Euclid's algorithm)
- Harmony search
- Interval (music)
- List of music software
- Mathematics and art
- Musical tuning
- Non-Pythagorean scale
- Piano key frequencies
- Rhythm
- The Glass Bead Game
- 3rd bridge (harmonic resonance based on equal string divisions)
- Tonality diamond
- Tonnetz
- Utonality and otonality
