= Ragisma =

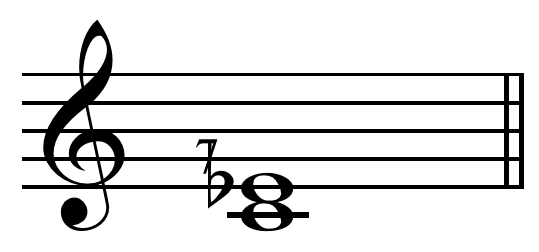
Septimal minor third on C.

In music and tuning, the ragisma is an interval with the ratio of 4375:4374, ≈0.396 cents (a superparticular ratio). It is usually defined as the difference between the septimal minor third (7:6) and two Bohlen–Pierce small semitones (27:25). It is also the difference between minor Bohlen–Pierce diesis (245:243) and septimal semicomma (126:125), as well as the difference between the septimal third tone (28:27) and the greater diesis (648:625).
