= Störmer (crater) =

Crater on the Moon

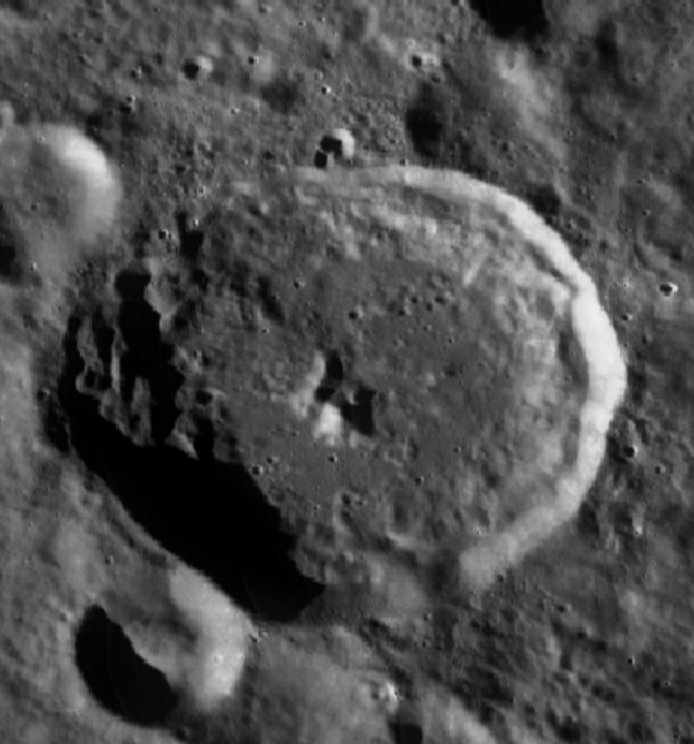
- LRO mosaic
- Coordinates: 57.3°N 146.3°E
- Diameter: 69 km
- Depth: Unknown
- Colongitude: 215° at sunrise
- Eponym: Carl Størmer

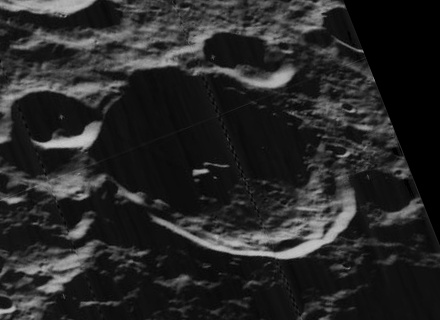
Oblique Lunar Orbiter 5 image

Störmer is a lunar impact crater that is located on the far side of the Moon from the Earth, named after Carl Størmer, a Norwegian mathematician and aurora researcher. It lies in the northern part of the lunar surface, to the southeast of the crater Olivier and to the north of van Rhijn.

This is a relatively young formation with features that have not received a significant amount of wear or erosion from subsequent impacts. The edge of the rim is sharply defined, and the inner wall is terraced along the northwestern side. The interior floor is relatively level, with a double-peak formation at the midpoint.

Störmer P, a satellite crater, is attached to the exterior of the rim of Störmer along the southwest side.

== Satellite craters ==
By convention these features are identified on lunar maps by placing the letter on the side of the crater midpoint that is closest to Störmer.

Störmer	Latitude	Longitude	Diameter
C	58.3° N	150.6° E	61 km
H	54.8° N	150.2° E	32 km
P	56.1° N	145.3° E	22 km
T	56.8° N	141.7° E	27 km
Y	60.3° N	144.8° E	26 km
