= Carl Størmer =

Norwegian geophysicist and mathematician

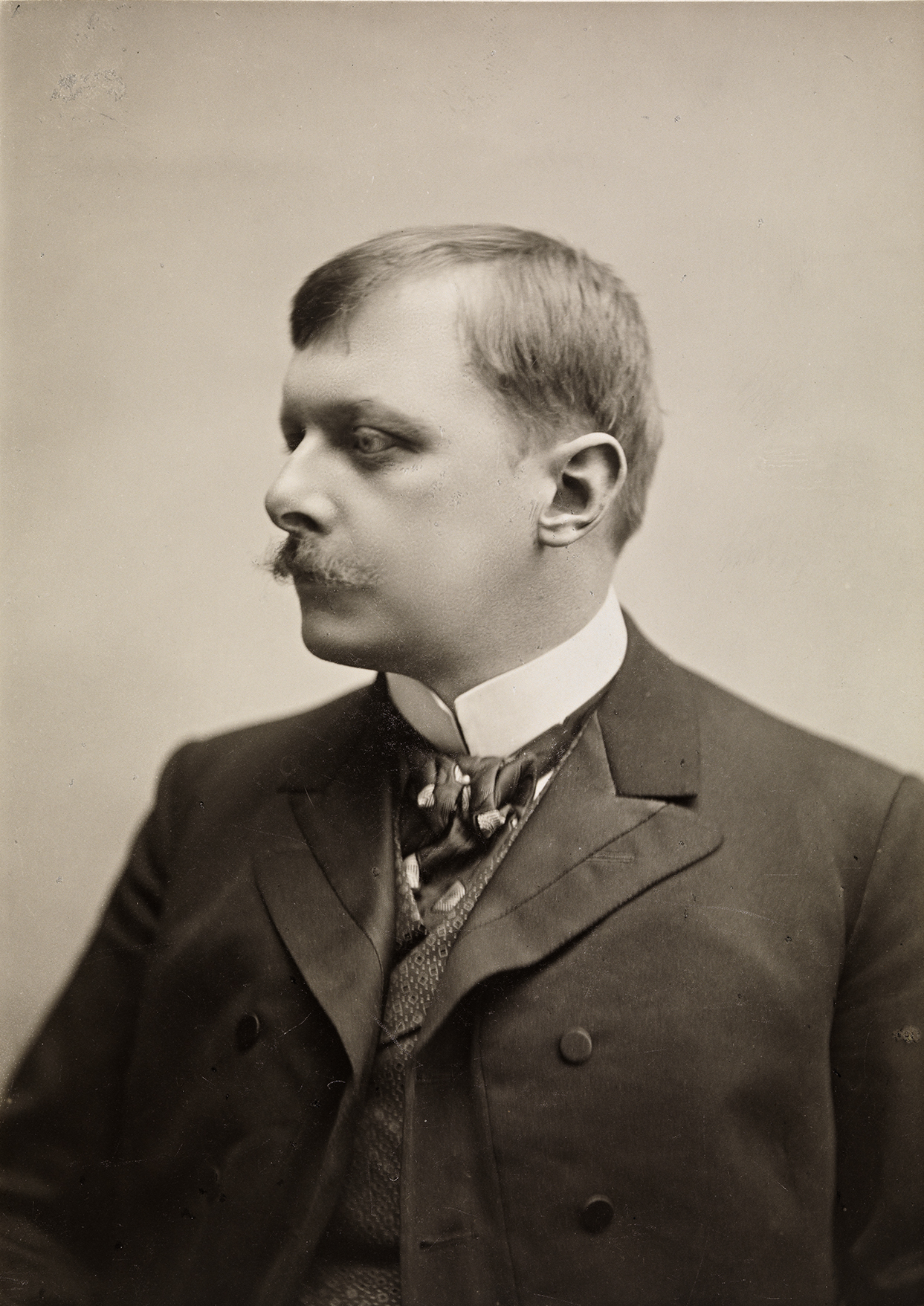
- Born: Fredrik Carl Mülertz Størmer; 3 September 1874; Skien, Sweden-Norway
- Died: 13 August 1957 (aged 82); Oslo, Kingdom of Norway
- Education: University of Oslo
- Known for: number theory aurorae
- Awards: Foreign Mem. Royal Society; Norwegian Academy; Janssen Medal; Grand Cross of St. Olav
- Scientific career
- Fields: mathematics; astrophysics

Fredrik Carl Mülertz Størmer (Norwegian pronunciation: [fʁɛdʁɪk kaːl ˈmʏlɐːt͡s ̍ˈʃtøːmɐː]) (3 September 1874 – 13 August 1957) was a Norwegian mathematician and astrophysicist. In mathematics, he is known for his work in number theory, including the calculation of π and Størmer's theorem on consecutive smooth numbers. In physics, he is known for studying the movement of charged particles in the magnetosphere and the formation of aurorae, and for his book on these subjects, From the Depths of Space to the Heart of the Atom. He worked for many years as a professor of mathematics at the University of Oslo in Norway. A crater on the far side of the Moon is named after him.

== Personal life and career ==
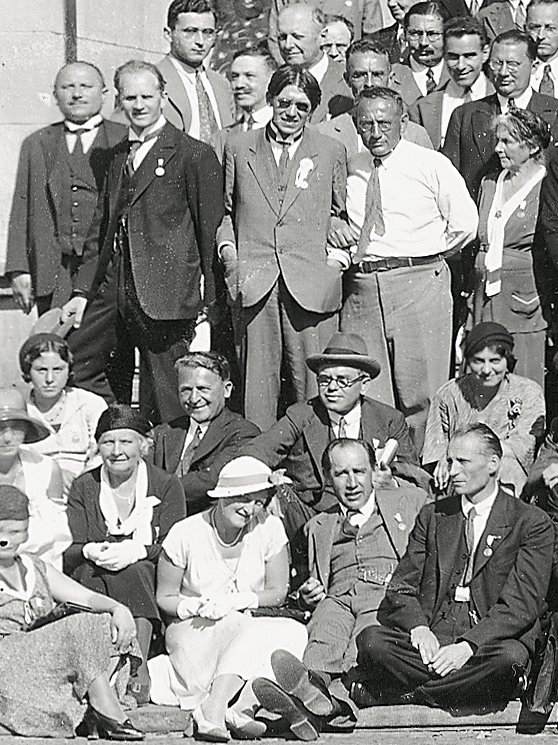
Carl Størmer (mid of top row) at the International Congress of Mathematicians, Zürich 1932; he was accompanied by Ms. Størmer (sitting left, dark clothing) and Ms. Lövenskiold (sitting, white hat).

Størmer was born on 3 September 1874 in Skien, the only child of a pharmacist Georg Ludvig Størmer (1842–1930) and Elisabeth Amalie Johanne Henriette Mülertz (1844–1916). His uncle was the entrepreneur and inventor Henrik Christian Fredrik Størmer.

Størmer studied mathematics at the Royal Frederick University in Kristiania, Norway (now the University of Oslo, in Oslo) from 1892 to 1897, earning the rank of candidatus realium in 1898. He then studied with Picard, Poincaré, Painlevé, Jordan, Darboux, and Goursat at the Sorbonne in Paris from 1898 to 1900. He returned to Kristiania in 1900 as a research fellow in mathematics, visited the University of Göttingen in 1902, and returned to Kristiania in 1903, where he was appointed as a professor of mathematics, a position he held for 43 years. After he received a permanent position in Kristiania, Størmer published his subsequent writings under a shortened version of his name, Carl Størmer. In 1918, he was elected as the first president of the newly formed Norwegian Mathematical Society. He participated regularly in Scandinavian mathematical congresses, and was president of the 1936 International Congress of Mathematicians in Oslo (from 1924 the new name of Kristiania). Størmer was also affiliated with the Institute of Theoretical Astrophysics at the University of Oslo, which was founded in 1934. He died on 13 August 1957, at Blindern.

He was also an amateur street photographer, beginning in his student days. In the years 1893-1897, he documented daily life on the streets of Oslo using a miniature CP Stirn spy camera. Between 1942 and 1943, he shared a small portion of his works with the public. However, it was not until he was 70 years old that he organized an exhibition showcasing all his historical photographs of celebrities that he had taken over the years. For instance it included one of Henrik Ibsen strolling down Karl Johans gate, the main road in Oslo. Most of these can now be viewed in Norway's Digitalt Museum.

He was also a supervisory council member of the insurance company Forsikringsselskapet Norden.

In February 1900 he married consul's daughter Ada Clauson (1877–1973), with whom he eventually had five children. Their son Leif Størmer became a professor of historical geology at the University of Oslo. His daughter Henny married landowner Carl Otto Løvenskiold. Carl Størmer is also the grandfather of the mathematician Erling Størmer.

== Mathematical research ==
Størmer's first mathematical publication, published when he was a beginning student at the age of 18, concerned trigonometric series generalizing the Taylor expansion of the arcsine function. He revisited this problem a few years later. Next, he systematically investigated Machin-like formula by which the number π may be represented as a rational combination of the so-called "Gregory numbers" of the form arctan 1/n. Machin's original formula,

$$\textstyle\pi = 16\arctan \frac15 - 4\arctan\frac1{239},$$

is of this type, and Størmer showed that there were three other ways of representing π as a rational combination of two Gregory numbers. He then investigated combinations of three Gregory numbers, and found 102 representations of π of this form, but was unable to determine whether there might be additional solutions of this type. These representations led to fast algorithms for computing numerical approximations of π. In particular, a four-term representation found by Størmer,

$$\textstyle\pi = 176 \arctan\frac{1}{57} + 28 \arctan\frac{1}{239} - 48 \arctan\frac{1}{682} + 96 \arctan\frac{1}{12943}$$

was used in a record-setting calculation of π to 1,241,100,000,000 decimal digits in 2002 by Yasumasa Kanada. Størmer is also noted for the Størmer numbers, which arose from the decomposition of Gregory numbers in Størmer's work.

Størmer's theorem, which he proved in 1897, shows that, for any finite set P of prime numbers, there are only finitely many pairs of consecutive integers having only the numbers from P as their prime factors. In addition, Størmer describes an algorithm for finding all such pairs. The superparticular ratios generated by these consecutive pairs are of particular importance in music theory. Størmer proves this theorem by reducing the problem to a finite set of Pell equations, and the theorem itself can also be interpreted as describing the possible factorizations of solutions to Pell's equation. Chapman quotes Louis Mordell as saying "His result is very pretty, and there are many applications of it."

Additional subjects of Størmer's mathematical research included Lie groups, the gamma function, and Diophantine approximation of algebraic numbers and of the transcendental numbers arising from elliptic functions. From 1905 Størmer was an editor of the journal Acta Mathematica, and he was also an editor of the posthumously-published mathematical works of Niels Henrik Abel and Sophus Lie.

== Astrophysical research ==
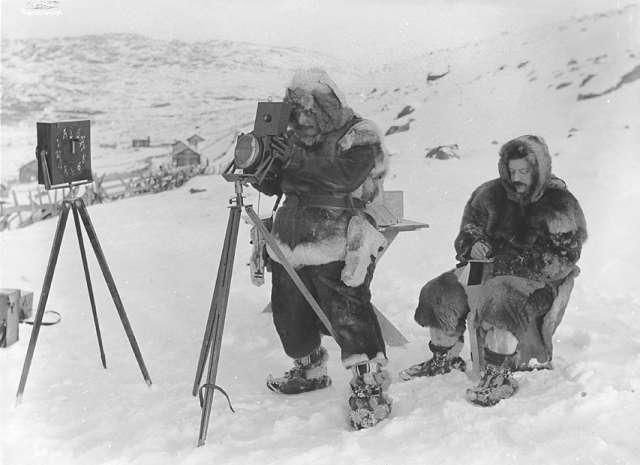
Carl Størmer with assistant Birkeland in 1910

From 1903, when Størmer first observed Kristian Birkeland's experimental attempts to explain the aurora borealis, he was fascinated by aurorae and related phenomena. His first work on the subject attempted to model mathematically the paths taken by charged particles perturbed by the influence of a magnetized sphere, and Størmer eventually published over 48 papers on the motion of charged particles. By modeling the problem using differential equations and polar coordinates, Størmer was able to show that the radius of curvature of any particle's path is proportional to the square of its distance from the sphere's center. To solve the resulting differential equations numerically, he used Verlet integration, which is therefore also known as Störmer's method. Ernst Brüche and Willard Harrison Bennett verified experimentally Størmer's predicted particle motions; Bennett called his experimental apparatus "Störmertron" in honor of Størmer. Størmer's calculations showed that small variations in the trajectories of particles approaching the earth would be magnified by the effects of the Earth's magnetic field, explaining the convoluted shapes of aurorae. Størmer also considered the possibility that particles might be trapped within the geomagnetic field, and worked out the orbits of these trapped particles. Størmer's work on this subject applies to what are today called the magnetospheric ring current and Van Allen radiation belts.

As well as modeling these phenomena mathematically, Størmer took many photographs of aurorae, from 20 different observatories across Norway. He measured their heights and latitudes by triangulation from multiple observatories, and showed that the aurora are typically as high as 100 kilometers above ground. He classified them by their shapes, and discovered in 1926 the "solar-illuminated aurora", a phenomenon that can occur at twilight when the upper parts of an aurora are lit by the sun; these aurorae can be as high as 1000 km above ground.

Størmer's book, From the Depths of Space to the Heart of the Atom, describing his work in this area, was translated into five different languages from the original Norwegian. A second book, The Polar Aurora (Oxford Press, 1955), contains both his experimental work on aurorae and his mathematical attempts to model them. In his review of this book, Canadian astronomer John F. Heard calls Størmer "the acknowledged authority" on aurorae. Heard writes, "The Polar Aurora will undoubtedly remain for many years a standard reference book; it belongs on the desk of anyone whose work or interest is involved with aurorae."

Other astrophysical phenomena investigated by Størmer include pulsations of the earth's magnetic field, echoing in radio transmissions, nacreous clouds and noctilucent clouds, zodiacal light, meteor trails, the solar corona and solar vortices, and cosmic rays.

== Awards and honors ==
Størmer was a Foreign Member of the Royal Society (ForMemRS) and a Corresponding Member of the French Academy of Sciences. He was also a member of the Norwegian Academy of Science and Letters from 1900. He was given honorary degrees by Oxford University (in 1947), the University of Copenhagen (1951), and the Sorbonne (1953), and in 1922 the French Academy awarded him their Janssen Medal. Three times Størmer was a plenary speaker in the International Congress of Mathematicians (1908 in Rome, 1924 in Toronto, and 1936 in Oslo); he was an invited speaker of the ICM in 1920 in Strasbourg and in 1932 in Zurich. In 1971, the crater Störmer on the far side of the Moon was named after him. The Lie-Størmer Center at UiT - The Arctic University of Norway is named after him

In 1902, Størmer was decorated with King Oscar II's Medal of Merit in gold. He was also decorated as a Knight, First Order of the Order of St. Olav in 1939. He was upgraded to Grand Cross of the Order of St. Olav in 1954.
