= Archimedes's cattle problem =

Mathematical problem in number theory

Smallest solution to Archimedes's cattle problem with each icon representing around 10^{206543} cattle

Archimedes's cattle problem (or the problema bovinum or problema Archimedis) is a problem in Diophantine analysis, the study of polynomial equations with integer solutions. Attributed to Archimedes, the problem involves computing the number of cattle in a herd of the sun god from a given set of restrictions. The problem was discovered by Gotthold Ephraim Lessing in a Greek manuscript containing a poem of 44 lines, in the Herzog August Library in Wolfenbüttel, Germany in 1773.

The problem remained unsolved for a number of years, due partly to the difficulty of computing the huge numbers involved in the solution. The general solution was found in 1880 by Carl Ernst August Amthor (1845–1916), headmaster of the Gymnasium zum Heiligen Kreuz (Gymnasium of the Holy Cross) in Dresden, Germany. Using logarithmic tables, he calculated the first digits of the smallest solution, showing that it is about 7.76×10^{206544} cattle, far more than could fit in the observable universe. The decimal form is too long for humans to calculate exactly, but multiple-precision arithmetic packages on computers can write it out explicitly.

== History ==
In 1769, Gotthold Ephraim Lessing was appointed librarian of the Herzog August Library in Wolfenbüttel, Germany, which contained many Greek and Latin manuscripts. A few years later, Lessing published translations of some of the manuscripts with commentaries. Among them was a Greek poem of forty-four lines, containing an arithmetical problem which asks the reader to find the number of cattle in the herd of the god of the sun. It is now generally credited to Archimedes.

=== Attribution to Archimedes ===
The question whether Archimedes actually set forth the problem is largely unsettled. There are only two ancient testimonies regarding its attribution. The first testimony is in the heading prefixed to the epigram itself. Heiberg translates it as, "the problem which Archimedes discovered and sent in an epigram... in a letter to Eratosthenes." Hultsch remarks that certain mistaken words in the heading as well as its syntax betray the hand of a writer who lived some centuries after Archimedes. But Hultsch thought the author must have relied upon some earlier source, believing the part about it being addressed to Eratosthenes could not have been fabricated. The second testimony is found in a scholia to Plato's Charmides, which references the problem, "called by Archimedes the Cattle-problem". Hultsch concludes that the text dates to the 2nd century BC at the latest. He opined that it is well within Archimedes' repertoire to pose such a problem, since he wrote treatises on very large numbers.

== Problem ==
The problem, as translated into English by Ivor Thomas, states:

If thou art diligent and wise, O stranger, compute the number of cattle of the Sun, who once upon a time grazed on the fields of the Thrinacian isle of Sicily, divided into four herds of different colours, one milk white, another a glossy black, a third yellow and the last dappled. In each herd were bulls, mighty in number according to these proportions: Understand, stranger, that the white bulls were equal to a half and a third of the black together with the whole of the yellow, while the black were equal to the fourth part of the dappled and a fifth, together with, once more, the whole of the yellow. Observe further that the remaining bulls, the dappled, were equal to a sixth part of the white and a seventh, together with all of the yellow. These were the proportions of the cows: The white were precisely equal to the third part and a fourth of the whole herd of the black; while the black were equal to the fourth part once more of the dappled and with it a fifth part, when all, including the bulls, went to pasture together. Now the dappled in four parts were equal in number to a fifth part and a sixth of the yellow herd. Finally the yellow were in number equal to a sixth part and a seventh of the white herd. If thou canst accurately tell, O stranger, the number of cattle of the Sun, giving separately the number of well-fed bulls and again the number of females according to each colour, thou wouldst not be called unskilled or ignorant of numbers, but not yet shalt thou be numbered among the wise.

But come, understand also all these conditions regarding the cattle of the Sun. When the white bulls mingled their number with the black, they stood firm, equal in depth and breadth, and the plains of Thrinacia, stretching far in all ways, were filled with their multitude. Again, when the yellow and the dappled bulls were gathered into one herd they stood in such a manner that their number, beginning from one, grew slowly greater till it completed a triangular figure, there being no bulls of other colours in their midst nor none of them lacking. If thou art able, O stranger, to find out all these things and gather them together in your mind, giving all the relations, thou shalt depart crowned with glory and knowing that thou hast been adjudged perfect in this species of wisdom.

== Solution ==
The first part of the problem can be solved readily by setting up a system of equations. If the number of white, black, dappled, and yellow bulls are written as $W, B, D,$ and $Y$, and the number of white, black, dappled, and yellow cows are written as $w,b,d,$ and $y$, the problem is simply to find a solution to

$$\begin{align}
W &= \frac{5}{6} B + Y, \\
B &= \frac{9}{20} D + Y, \\
D &= \frac{13}{42} W + Y, \\
w &= \frac{7}{12} (B + b), \\
b &= \frac{9}{20} (D + d), \\
d &= \frac{11}{30} (Y + y), \\
y &= \frac{13}{42} (W + w),
\end{align}$$

which is a system of seven equations with eight unknowns. It is indeterminate and has infinitely many solutions. The least positive integers satisfying the seven equations are

$$\begin{align}
B &= 7\,460\,514 = 4657 \times 1602,\\
W &= 10\,366\,482 = 4657 \times 2226,\\
D &= 7\,358\,060 = 4657 \times 1580,\\
Y &= 4\,149\,387 = 4657 \times 891,\\
b &= 4\,893\,246, \\
w &= 7\,206\,360, \\
d &= 3\,515\,820, \\
y &= 5\,439\,213,
\end{align}$$

which is a total of 50389082 cattle, and the other solutions are integral multiples of these. Note that the first four numbers are multiples of the prime number p = 4657, and both p and p + 1 will appear repeatedly below.

The second part of the problem states that $W+B$ is a square number, and $Y+D$ is a triangular number. The general solution to this part of the problem was first found by A. Amthor in 1880. The following version of it was described by H. W. Lenstra, based on Pell's equation: the solution given above for the first part of the problem should be multiplied by

$$n = \frac{(x^{4658j} - x^{-4658j})^2}{4657 \times 79072},$$

where j is any positive integer and

$$x = 300\,426\,607\,914\,281\,713\,365 \sqrt{609} + 84\,129\,507\,677\,858\,393\,258 \sqrt{7766},$$

Equivalently, squaring x results in

$$x^2 = u + v\sqrt{609 \times 7766},$$

where $(u, v)$ is the fundamental solution of the Pell equation

$$u^2 - (609 \times 7766) v^2 = 1.$$

The size of the smallest herd that could satisfy both the first and second parts of the problem is then given by j = 1 and is about $7.76 \times 10^{206\,544}$ (first solved by Amthor). Modern computers can easily print out all digits of the answer. This was first done at the University of Waterloo, in 1965 by Hugh C. Williams, R. A. German, and Charles Robert Zarnke. They used a combination of the IBM 7040 and IBM 1620 computers.

== Pell equation ==
The constraints of the second part of the problem are straightforward and the actual Pell equation that needs to be solved can easily be given. First, it one asks that $B + W$ should be a square, or using the values given above,

$$B + W = 7\,460\,514\,k + 10\,366\,482\,k = (2^2 \times 3 \times 11 \times 29 \times 4657)k,$$

thus one should set $k = (3 \times 11 \times 29 \times 4657) q^2$ for some integer q. That solves the first condition. For the second, it requires that $D + Y$ should be a triangular number:

$$D + Y = \frac{t^2 + t}{2}.$$

Solving for t,

$$t = \frac{-1 \pm \sqrt{1 + 8(D + Y)}}{2}.$$

Substituting the value of D + Y and k and finding a value of q^{2} such that the discriminant of this quadratic is a perfect square p^{2} entails solving the Pell equation

$$p^2 - (2^2 \times 609 \times 7766 \times 4657^2) q^2 = 1.$$

Amthor's approach discussed in the previous section was essentially to find the smallest $v$ such that it is integrally divisible by $2\times 4657$. The fundamental solution of this equation has more than 100,000 decimal digits.
