= Størmer's theorem =

Gives a finite bound on pairs of consecutive smooth numbers

In number theory, Størmer's theorem, named after Carl Størmer, gives a finite bound on the number of consecutive pairs of smooth numbers that exist, for a given degree of smoothness, and provides a method for finding all such pairs using Pell equations. It follows from the Thue–Siegel–Roth theorem that there are only a finite number of pairs of this type, but Størmer gave a procedure for finding them all.

== Statement ==
If one chooses a finite set $P=\{p_1,p_2,\dots p_k\}$ of prime numbers then the P-smooth numbers are defined as the set of integers

$$\left\{p_1^{e_1}p_2^{e_2}\cdots p_k^{e_k}\mid e_i\in\{0,1,2,\ldots\}\right\}$$

that can be generated by products of numbers in P. Then Størmer's theorem states that, for every choice of P, there are only finitely many pairs of consecutive P-smooth numbers. Further, it gives a method of finding them all using Pell equations.

== The procedure ==
Størmer's original procedure involves solving a set of roughly 3^{k} Pell equations, in each one finding only the smallest solution. A simplified version of the procedure, due to D. H. Lehmer, is described below; it solves fewer equations but finds more solutions in each equation.

Let P be the given set of primes, and define a number to be P-smooth if all its prime factors belong to P. Assume p_{1} = 2; otherwise there could be no consecutive P-smooth numbers, because all P-smooth numbers would be odd. Lehmer's method involves solving the Pell equation

$$x^2 - 2qy^2 = 1$$

for each P-smooth square-free number q other than 2. Each such number q is generated as a product of a subset of P, so there are 2^{k} − 1 Pell equations to solve. For each such equation, let x_{i}, y_{i} be the generated solutions, for i in the range from 1 to max(3, (p_{k} + 1)/2) (inclusive), where p_{k} is the largest of the primes in P.

Then, as Lehmer shows, all consecutive pairs of P-smooth numbers are of the form (x_{i} − 1)/2, (x_{i} + 1)/2. Thus one can find all such pairs by testing the numbers of this form for P-smoothness.

Lehmer's paper furthermore shows that applying a similar procedure to the equation

$$x^2 - Dy^2 = 1,$$

where D ranges over all P-smooth square-free numbers other than 1, yields those pairs of P-smooth numbers separated by 2: the smooth pairs are then (x − 1, x + 1), where (x, y) is one of the first max(3, (max(P) + 1) / 2) solutions of that equation.

== Example ==
To find the ten consecutive pairs of {2,3,5}-smooth numbers (in music theory, giving the superparticular ratios for just tuning) let P = {2,3,5}. There are seven P-smooth squarefree numbers q (omitting the eighth P-smooth squarefree number, 2): 1, 3, 5, 6, 10, 15, and 30, each of which leads to a Pell equation. The number of solutions per Pell equation required by Lehmer's method is max(3, (5 + 1)/2) = 3, so this method generates three solutions to each Pell equation, as follows.

- For q = 1, the first three solutions to the Pell equation x^{2} − 2y^{2} = 1 are (3,2), (17,12), and (99,70). Thus, for each of the three values x_{i} = 3, 17, and 99, Lehmer's method tests the pair (x_{i} − 1)/2, (x_{i} + 1)/2 for smoothness; the three pairs to be tested are (1,2), (8,9), and (49,50). Both (1,2) and (8,9) are pairs of consecutive P-smooth numbers, but (49,50) is not, as 49 has 7 as a prime factor.
- For q = 3, the first three solutions to the Pell equation x^{2} − 6y^{2} = 1 are (5,2), (49,20), and (485,198). From the three values x_{i} = 5, 49, and 485 Lehmer's method forms the three candidate pairs of consecutive numbers (x_{i} − 1)/2, (x_{i} + 1)/2: (2,3), (24,25), and (242,243). Of these, (2,3) and (24,25) are pairs of consecutive P-smooth numbers but (242,243) is not.
- For q = 5, the first three solutions to the Pell equation x^{2} − 10y^{2} = 1 are (19,6), (721,228), and (27379,8658). The Pell solution (19,6) leads to the pair of consecutive P-smooth numbers (9,10); the other two solutions to the Pell equation do not lead to P-smooth pairs.
- For q = 6, the first three solutions to the Pell equation x^{2} − 12y^{2} = 1 are (7,2), (97,28), and (1351,390). The Pell solution (7,2) leads to the pair of consecutive P-smooth numbers (3,4).
- For q = 10, the first three solutions to the Pell equation x^{2} − 20y^{2} = 1 are (9,2), (161,36), and (2889,646). The Pell solution (9,2) leads to the pair of consecutive P-smooth numbers (4,5) and the Pell solution (161,36) leads to the pair of consecutive P-smooth numbers (80,81).
- For q = 15, the first three solutions to the Pell equation x^{2} − 30y^{2} = 1 are (11,2), (241,44), and (5291,966). The Pell solution (11,2) leads to the pair of consecutive P-smooth numbers (5,6).
- For q = 30, the first three solutions to the Pell equation x^{2} − 60y^{2} = 1 are (31,4), (1921,248), and (119071,15372). The Pell solution (31,4) leads to the pair of consecutive P-smooth numbers (15,16).

== Number and size of solutions ==
Størmer's original result can be used to show that the number of consecutive pairs of integers that are smooth with respect to a set of k primes is at most 3^{k} − 2^{k}. Lehmer's result produces a tighter bound for sets of small primes: (2^{k} − 1) × max(3,(p_{k}+1)/2).

The number of consecutive pairs of integers that are smooth with respect to the first k primes are

1, 4, 10, 23, 40, 68, 108, 167, 241, 345, ... (sequence A002071 in the OEIS).

The largest integer from all these pairs, for each k, is

2, 9, 81, 4375, 9801, 123201, 336141, 11859211, ... (sequence A117581 in the OEIS).

OEIS also lists the number of pairs of this type where the larger of the two integers in the pair is square (sequence A117582 in the OEIS) or triangular (sequence A117583 in the OEIS), as both types of pair arise frequently.

The size of the solutions can also be bounded: in the case where x and x+1 are required to be P-smooth, then

$$\log(x) < M (2 + \log(8S)) \sqrt{2S} - \log(4),$$

where M = max(3, (max(P) + 1) / 2) and S is the product of all elements of P, and in the case where the smooth pair is x ± 1, we have

$$\log(x-1) < M(2 + \log(4S)) \sqrt{S} - \log(2).$$

== Generalizations and applications ==
Louis Mordell wrote about this result, saying that it "is very pretty, and there are many applications of it."

=== In mathematics ===
Chein (1976) used Størmer's method to prove Catalan's conjecture on the nonexistence of consecutive perfect powers (other than 8,9) in the case where one of the two powers is a square.

Mabkhout (1993) proved that every number x^{4} + 1, for x > 3, has a prime factor greater than or equal to 137. Størmer's theorem is an important part of his proof, in which he reduces the problem to the solution of 128 Pell equations.

Several authors have extended Størmer's work by providing methods for listing the solutions to more general diophantine equations, or by providing more general divisibility criteria for the solutions to Pell equations.

Conrey, Holmstrom & McLaughlin (2013) describe a computational procedure that, empirically, finds many but not all of the consecutive pairs of smooth numbers described by Størmer's theorem, and is much faster than using Pell's equation to find all solutions.

=== In music theory ===
In the musical practice of just intonation, musical intervals can be described as ratios between positive integers. More specifically, they can be described as ratios between members of the harmonic series. Any musical tone can be broken into its fundamental frequency and harmonic frequencies, which are integer multiples of the fundamental. This series is conjectured to be the basis of natural harmony and melody. The tonal complexity of ratios between these harmonics is said to get more complex with higher prime factors. To limit this tonal complexity, an interval is said to be n-limit when both its numerator and denominator are n-smooth. Furthermore, superparticular ratios are very important in just tuning theory as they represent ratios between adjacent members of the harmonic series.

Størmer's theorem allows all possible superparticular ratios in a given limit to be found. For example, in the 3-limit (Pythagorean tuning), the only possible superparticular ratios are 2/1 (the octave), 3/2 (the perfect fifth), 4/3 (the perfect fourth), and 9/8 (the whole step). That is, the only pairs of consecutive integers that have only powers of two and three in their prime factorizations are (1,2), (2,3), (3,4), and (8,9). If this is extended to the 5-limit, six additional superparticular ratios are available: 5/4 (the major third), 6/5 (the minor third), 10/9 (the minor tone), 16/15 (the minor second), 25/24 (the minor semitone), and 81/80 (the syntonic comma). All are musically meaningful.
