= Superparticular ratio =

Ratio of two consecutive integers

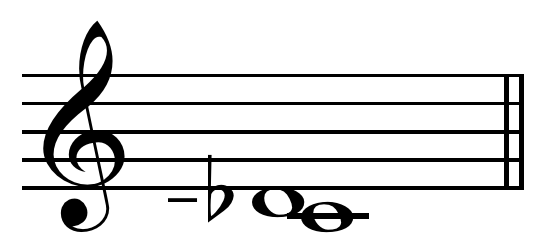
Just diatonic semitone on C: 16/15 = (15 + 1)/15 = 1 + 1/15

In mathematics, a superparticular ratio, also called a superparticular number or epimoric ratio, is the ratio of two consecutive integer numbers.

More particularly, the ratio takes the form:

$\frac{n + 1}{n} = 1 + \frac{1}{n}$ where n is a positive integer.

Thus:

A superparticular number is when a great number contains a lesser number, to which it is compared, and at the same time one part of it. For example, when 3 and 2 are compared, they contain 2, plus the 3 has another 1, which is half of two. When 3 and 4 are compared, they each contain a 3, and the 4 has another 1, which is a third part of 3. Again, when 5, and 4 are compared, they contain the number 4, and the 5 has another 1, which is the fourth part of the number 4, etc.

— Throop (2006),

Superparticular ratios were written about by Nicomachus in his treatise Introduction to Arithmetic. Although these numbers have applications in modern pure mathematics, the areas of study that most frequently refer to the superparticular ratios by this name are music theory and the history of mathematics.

== Mathematical properties ==
As Leonhard Euler observed, the superparticular numbers (including also the multiply superparticular ratios, numbers formed by adding an integer other than one to a unit fraction) are exactly the rational numbers whose simple continued fraction terminates after two terms. The numbers whose continued fraction terminates in one term are the integers, while the remaining numbers, with three or more terms in their continued fractions, are superpartient.

The Wallis product

$$\prod_{n=1}^{\infty} \left(\frac{2n}{2n-1} \cdot \frac{2n}{2n+1}\right) = \frac{2}{1} \cdot \frac{2}{3} \cdot \frac{4}{3} \cdot \frac{4}{5} \cdot \frac{6}{5} \cdot \frac{6}{7} \cdots = \frac{4}{3}\cdot\frac{16}{15}\cdot\frac{36}{35}\cdots=2\cdot\frac{8}{9}\cdot\frac{24}{25}\cdot\frac{48}{49}\cdots=\frac{\pi}{2}$$

represents the irrational number π in several ways as a product of superparticular ratios and their inverses. It is also possible to convert the Leibniz formula for π into an Euler product of superparticular ratios in which each term has a prime number as its numerator and the nearest multiple of four as its denominator:

$$\frac{\pi}{4} = \frac{3}{4} \cdot \frac{5}{4} \cdot \frac{7}{8} \cdot \frac{11}{12} \cdot \frac{13}{12} \cdot\frac{17}{16}\cdots$$

In graph theory, superparticular numbers (or rather, their reciprocals, 1/2, 2/3, 3/4, etc.) arise via the Erdős–Stone theorem as the possible values of the upper density of an infinite graph.

== Other applications ==
In the study of harmony, many musical intervals can be expressed as a superparticular ratio (for example, due to octave equivalency, the ninth harmonic, 9/1, may be expressed as a superparticular ratio, 9/8). Indeed, whether a ratio was superparticular was the most important criterion in Ptolemy's formulation of musical harmony. In this application, Størmer's theorem can be used to list all possible superparticular numbers for a given limit; that is, all ratios of this type in which both the numerator and denominator are smooth numbers.

These ratios are also important in visual harmony. Aspect ratios of 4:3 and 3:2 are common in digital photography, and aspect ratios of 7:6 and 5:4 are used in medium format and large format photography respectively.

== Ratio names and related intervals ==
Every pair of adjacent positive integers represent a superparticular ratio, and similarly every pair of adjacent harmonics in the harmonic series (music) represent a superparticular ratio. Many individual superparticular ratios have their own names, either in historical mathematics or in music theory. These include the following:

Examples
Ratio	Cents	Name/musical interval	Ben Johnston notation above C	Audio
2:1	1200	duplex: (Note: Ancient name) octave	C'	
3:2	701.96	sesquialterum: perfect fifth	G	
4:3	498.04	sesquitertium: perfect fourth	F	
5:4	386.31	sesquiquartum: major third	E	
6:5	315.64	sesquiquintum: minor third	E♭	
7:6	266.87	septimal minor third	E♭	
8:7	231.17	septimal major second	D-	
9:8	203.91	sesquioctavum: major second	D	
10:9	182.40	sesquinona: minor tone	D-	
11:10	165.00	greater undecimal neutral second	D↑♭-	
12:11	150.64	lesser undecimal neutral second	D↓	
15:14	119.44	septimal diatonic semitone	C♯	
16:15	111.73	just diatonic semitone	D♭-	
17:16	104.96	minor diatonic semitone	C♯	
21:20	84.47	septimal chromatic semitone	D♭	
25:24	70.67	just chromatic semitone	C♯	
28:27	62.96	septimal third-tone	D♭-	
32:31	54.96	31st subharmonic, inferior quarter tone	D♭-	
49:48	35.70	septimal diesis	D♭	
50:49	34.98	septimal sixth-tone	B♯-	
64:63	27.26	septimal comma, 63rd subharmonic	C-	
81:80	21.51	syntonic comma	C+	
126:125	13.79	septimal semicomma	D	
128:127	13.58	127th subharmonic		
225:224	7.71	septimal kleisma	B♯	
256:255	6.78	255th subharmonic	D-	
4375:4374	0.40	ragisma	C♯-	

The root of some of these terms comes from Latin sesqui- "one and a half" (from semis "a half" and -que "and") describing the ratio 3:2.
